Italy is considered one of the birthplaces of Western civilization and a cultural superpower. Italian culture is the culture of the Italians, a Romance ethnic group, and is incredibly diverse spanning the entirety of the Italian peninsula and the islands of Sardinia and Sicily. Italy has been the starting point of phenomena of international impact such as the Roman Republic, Roman Empire, the Roman Catholic Church, the Latin alphabet, the Maritime republics, Romanesque art, Scholasticism, the Renaissance, the Age of Discovery, Mannerism, the Opera, the Scientific revolution, the Baroque, Neoclassicism, the Risorgimento, the Futurism, Fascism, and European integration.

Italy was home to many well-known and influential civilizations, including Italic peoples such as the Etruscans, the Samnites and the Romans, while also hosting colonies from important foreign civilizations like the Phoenicians, the Celts and the Greeks. Etruscan and Samnite cultures flourished in Italy before the emergence of the Roman Republic, which conquered and incorporated them. Phoenicians, Celts and Greeks established settlements in Italy beginning several centuries before the birth of Christ, and the Greek settlements in particular developed into thriving classical civilizations, for example the cities of Magna Graecia.

From the Middle Ages to the early modern period the region that is now Italy was divided into numerous independent states, until 1861 when it became a nation-state. Due to this comparatively late unification, and the historical autonomy of the regions that comprise the Italian peninsula, many traditions and customs that are now recognized as distinctly Italian can be identified by their regions of origin. Despite the political and social isolation of some of these regions, Italy's contributions to the cultural and historical heritage of Europe and the world remain immense.

The famous elements of Italian culture are its art, music, cinema, style, and iconic food. Italy was the birthplace of opera, and for generations the language of opera was Italian, irrespective of the nationality of the composer. Italy had a huge presence in the development of Classical music, birthing Baroque music, many forms of musical composition such as the Symphony, the Sonata and the Concerto, as well as many important composers such as Claudio Monteverdi, Antonio Vivaldi, Gioachino Rossini, Gaetano Donizetti, Vincenzo Bellini, Giuseppe Verdi, and Giacomo Puccini. Italy is known for its lively folk dances. The most worldwide recognized folk dance is the Tarantella, a dance originating in the Province of Taranto, Apulia, as well as its many variations across Italy such as the Calabrian Tarantella, the Pizzica, and the Tammurriata. Italy has a vibrant electronic dance music scene consisting of Italian-born genres such as Italo disco, lento violento, and dream trance as well as foreign genres such as hardstyle. Before being exported to France, the famous Ballet dance genre also originated in Italy. Popular tastes in drama in Italy have long favored comedy; the improvisational style known as the Commedia dell'arte began in Italy in the mid-16th century and is still performed today. Italian cinema is revered throughout the world. The art film has its origins in Italy. Spaghetti Westerns emerged with the release of Sergio Leone's, A Fistful of Dollars, a genre consisting of films mostly produced and directed by Italians. Both the internal and external faces of Western culture were born on the Italian peninsula, whether one looks at the history of the Christian faith, civil institutions (such as the Senate), philosophy, law, art, science, or social customs and culture.

The country boasts several world-famous cities. Rome was the ancient capital of the Roman Empire, seat of the Pope of the Catholic Church, capital of reunified Italy and artistic, cultural and cinematographic centre of world relevance. Florence was the heart of the Renaissance, a period of great achievements in the arts at the end of the Middle Ages. Other important cities include Turin, which used to be the capital of Italy, and is now one of the world's great centers of automobile engineering. Milan is the industrial and financial capital of Italy and one of the world's fashion capitals. Venice, former capital of a major financial and maritime power from the Middle Ages to the early modern period, with its intricate canal system attracts tourists from all over the world especially during the Venetian Carnival and the Biennale. Naples, with the largest historic city centre in Europe and the oldest continuously active public opera house in the world (Teatro di San Carlo). Bologna is the main transport hub of the country, as well as the home of the oldest university in the world and of a worldwide famous cuisine.

Italy is home to the greatest number of UNESCO World Heritage Sites (58) to date, and according to one estimate the country is home to half the world's great art treasures. Overall, the nation has an estimated 100,000 monuments of any sort (churches, cathedrals, archaeological sites, houses and statues). During its history, the nation has given birth to an enormous number of notable people who have made major contributions to the world.

Arts 

Italian art has influenced several major movements throughout the centuries and has produced several great artists, including painters, architects and sculptors. Today, Italy has an important place in the international art scene, with several major art galleries, museums and exhibitions; major artistic centers in the country include Rome, Florence, Venice, Milan, Turin, Genoa, Naples, Palermo, Lecce and other cities. Italy is home to 58 World Heritage Sites, the largest number of any country in the world.

Since ancient times, Greeks, Etruscans and Celts have inhabited the south, centre and north of the Italian peninsula respectively. The very numerous rock drawings in Valcamonica are as old as 8,000 BC, and there are rich remains of Etruscan art from thousands of tombs, as well as rich remains from the Greek colonies at Paestum, Agrigento and elsewhere. Ancient Rome finally emerged as the dominant Italian and European power. The Roman remains in Italy are of extraordinary richness, from the grand Imperial monuments of Rome itself to the survival of exceptionally preserved ordinary buildings in Pompeii and neighbouring sites. Following the fall of the Roman Empire, in the Middle Ages Italy, especially the north, remained an important centre, not only of the Carolingian art and Ottonian art of the Holy Roman Emperors, but for the Byzantine art of Ravenna and other sites.

Italy was the main centre of artistic developments throughout the Renaissance (1300–1600), beginning with the Proto-Renaissance of Giotto and reaching a particular peak in the High Renaissance of Leonardo da Vinci, Michelangelo and Raphael, whose works inspired the later phase of the Renaissance, known as Mannerism. Italy retained its artistic dominance into the 17th century with the Baroque (1600-1750). Cultural tourism and Neoclassicism (1750-1850) became a major prop to an otherwise faltering economy. Both Baroque and Neoclassicism originated in Rome and were the last Italian-born styles that spread to all Western art.

However, Italy maintained a presence in the international art scene from the mid-19th century onwards, with cultural movements such as the Macchiaioli, Futurism, Metaphysical, Novecento Italiano, Spatialism, Arte Povera, and Transavantgarde.

Architecture 

Italy is known for its considerable architectural achievements, such as the construction of arches, domes and similar structures during ancient Rome, the founding of the Renaissance architectural movement in the late-14th to 16th centuries, and being the homeland of Palladianism, a style of construction which inspired movements such as that of Neoclassical architecture, and influenced the designs which noblemen built their country houses all over the world, notably in the UK, Australia and the US during the late 17th to early 20th centuries. The history of architecture in Italy is one that begins with the ancient styles of the Etruscans and Greeks, progressing to classical Roman, then to the revival of the classical Roman era during the Renaissance and evolving into the Baroque era. During the period of the Italian Renaissance it had been customary for students of architecture to travel to Rome to study the ancient ruins and buildings as an essential part of their education.

The Christian concept of a Basilica, a style of church architecture that came to dominate the early Middle Ages, was invented in Rome. They were known for being long, rectangular buildings, which were built in an almost ancient Roman style, often rich in mosaics and decorations. The early Christians' art and architecture was also widely inspired by that of the pagan Romans; statues, mosaics and paintings decorated all their churches. Old St. Peter's Church (begun about A.D. 330) was probably the first significant early Christian basilica, a style of church architecture that came to dominate the early Middle Ages. Old St. Peter's stood on the site of the present St. Peter's Basilica in Rome. The first significant buildings in the medieval Romanesque style were churches built in Italy during the 800s. Several outstanding examples of the Byzantine architectural style of the Middle East were also built in Italy. The Byzantines kept Roman principles of architecture and art alive, and the most famous structure from this period is the Basilica of St Mark in Venice.

The Romanesque movement, which went from approximately 800 AD to 1100 AD, was one of the most fruitful and creative periods in Italian architecture, when several masterpieces, such as the Leaning Tower of Pisa in the Piazza dei Miracoli, and the Basilica of Sant'Ambrogio in Milan were built. It was known for its usage of the Roman arches, stained glass windows, and also its curved columns which commonly featured in cloisters. The main innovation of Italian Romanesque architecture was the vault, which had never been seen before in the history of Western architecture.

A flowering of Italian architecture took place during the Renaissance. Filippo Brunelleschi contributed to architectural design with his dome for the Cathedral of Florence, a feat of engineering that had not been accomplished since antiquity. A popular achievement of Italian Renaissance architecture was St. Peter's Basilica, originally designed by Donato Bramante in the early 16th century. Also, Andrea Palladio influenced architects throughout western Europe with the villas and palaces he designed in the middle and late 16th century; the city of Vicenza, with its twenty-three buildings designed by Palladio, and twenty-four Palladian Villas of the Veneto are listed by UNESCO as part of a World Heritage Site named City of Vicenza and the Palladian Villas of the Veneto.

The Baroque period produced several outstanding Italian architects in the 17th century, especially known for their churches. The most original work of all late Baroque and Rococo architecture is the Palazzina di caccia di Stupinigi, dating back to the 18th century. Luigi Vanvitelli began in 1752 the construction of the Royal Palace of Caserta. In this large complex, the grandiose Baroque style interiors and gardens are opposed to a more sober building envelope. In the late 18th and early 19th centuries Italy was affected by the Neoclassical architectural movement. Villas, palaces, gardens, interiors and art began to be based on Roman and Greek themes.

In the late 18th and early 19th centuries Italy was affected by the Neoclassical architectural movement. Everything from villas, palaces, gardens, interiors and art began to be based on Roman and Greek themes, and buildings were also widely themed on the Villa Capra "La Rotonda", the masterpiece by Andrea Palladio.

Italian modern and contemporary architecture refers to architecture in Italy during 20th and 21st centuries. During the Fascist period the so-called "Novecento movement" flourished, with figures such as Gio Ponti, Peter Aschieri, Giovanni Muzio. This movement was based on the rediscovery of imperial Rome. Marcello Piacentini, who was responsible for the urban transformations of several cities in Italy, and remembered for the disputed Via della Conciliazione in Rome, devised a form of "simplified Neoclassicism".

The fascist architecture (shown perfectly in the EUR buildings) was followed by the Neoliberty style (seen in earlier works of Vittorio Gregotti) and Brutalist architecture (Torre Velasca in Milan group BBPR, a residential building via Piagentina in Florence, Leonardo Savioli and works by Giancarlo De Carlo).

Cinema 

The cinema of Italy comprises the films made within Italy or by Italian directors. Since its beginning, Italian cinema has influenced film movements worldwide. Italy is one of the birthplaces of art cinema and the stylistic aspect of film has been the most important factor in the history of Italian film.

The history of Italian cinema began a few months after the Lumière brothers began motion picture exhibitions. The first Italian director is considered to be Vittorio Calcina, a collaborator of the Lumière Brothers, who filmed Pope Leo XIII in 1896. The first films date back to 1896 and were made in the main cities of the Italian peninsula. These brief experiments immediately met the curiosity of the popular class, encouraging operators to produce new films until they laid the foundations for the birth of a true film industry. In the early years of the 20th century, silent cinema developed, bringing numerous Italian stars to the forefront until the end of World War I. In the early 1900s, artistic and epic films such as Otello (1906), The Last Days of Pompeii (1908), L'Inferno (1911), Quo Vadis (1913), and Cabiria (1914), were made as adaptations of books or stage plays. Italian filmmakers were using complex set designs, lavish costumes, and record budgets, to produce pioneering films.

The oldest European avant-garde cinema movement, Italian futurism, took place in the late 1910s. After a period of decline in the 1920s, the Italian film industry was revitalized in the 1930s with the arrival of sound film. A popular Italian genre during this period, the Telefoni Bianchi, consisted of comedies with glamorous backgrounds. Calligrafismo was instead in a sharp contrast to Telefoni Bianchi-American style comedies and is rather artistic, highly formalistic, expressive in complexity and deals mainly with contemporary literary material. While Italy's Fascist government provided financial support for the nation's film industry, it also engaged in censorship, and thus many Italian films produced in the late 1930s were propaganda films.  

A new era took place at the end of World War II, with the Italian film that was widely recognised and exported until an artistic decline around the 1980s. Notable Italian film directors from this period include Vittorio De Sica, Federico Fellini, Sergio Leone, Pier Paolo Pasolini, Luchino Visconti, Michelangelo Antonioni, Dussio Tessari and Roberto Rossellini; some of these are recognised among the greatest and most influential filmmakers of all time. Movies include world cinema treasures such as Bicycle Thieves, La dolce vita, 8½, The Good, the Bad and the Ugly, and Once Upon a Time in the West. The mid-1940s to the early 1950s was the heyday of neorealist films, reflecting the poor condition of post-war Italy.

As the country grew wealthier in the 1950s, a form of neorealism known as pink neorealism succeeded, and starting from the 1950s through the Commedia all'italiana genre, and other film genres, such as sword-and-sandal followed as Spaghetti Westerns, were popular in the 1960s and 1970s. Actresses such as Sophia Loren, Giulietta Masina and Gina Lollobrigida achieved international stardom during this period. Erotic Italian thrillers, or giallos, produced by directors such as Mario Bava and Dario Argento in the 1970s, also influenced the horror genre worldwide. In recent years, the Italian scene has received only occasional international attention, with movies like Cinema Paradiso written and directed by Giuseppe Tornatore, Mediterraneo directed by Gabriele Salvatores, Life Is Beautiful directed by Roberto Benigni, Il Postino: The Postman with Massimo Troisi and The Great Beauty directed by Paolo Sorrentino.

The aforementioned Cinecittà studio is today the largest film and television production facility in Europe, where many international box office hits were filmed. In the 1950s, the number of international productions being made there led to Rome's being dubbed "Hollywood on the Tiber". More than 3,000 productions have been made on its lot, of which 90 received an Academy Award nomination and 47 of these won it, from some cinema classics to recent rewarded features (such as Roman Holiday, Ben-Hur, Cleopatra, Romeo and Juliet, The English Patient, The Passion of the Christ, and Gangs of New York).

The Venice International Film Festival, awarding the "Golden Lion" and held annually since 1932, is the oldest film festival in the world and one of the "Big Three" alongside Cannes and Berlin. In 2008 the Venice Days ("Giornate degli Autori"), a section held in parallel to the Venice Film Festival, has produced in collaboration with Cinecittà studios and the Ministry of Cultural Heritage a list of 100 films that have changed the collective memory of the country between 1942 and 1978: the "100 Italian films to be saved". The country is also famed for its prestigious David di Donatello. Italy is the most awarded country at the Academy Awards for Best Foreign Language Film, with 14 awards won, 3 Special Awards and 28 nominations. , Italian films have also won 12 Palmes d'Or (the second-most of any country), 11 Golden Lions and 7 Golden Bears.

Comics

The official birth of Italian comics (usually called Fumetti in Italian) is 27 December 1908, when the first issue of the Corriere dei Piccoli was published. Attilio Mussino has produced for this weekly a wide range of characters, including a little black child, Bilbolbul, whose almost surrealist adventures took place in a fantastic Africa.

In 1932 publisher Lotario Vecchi, had already begun publication of Jumbo magazine, using exclusively North American authors. The magazine reached a circulation of 350.000 copies in Italy, sanctioning comics as a mainstream medium with broad appeal. Vecchi moved to Spain three years later, bringing the same title.

In December 1932, the first Disney comic in Italy, Mickey Mouse, or Topolino in Italian, had been launched by the Florentine publisher Nerbini. The Disney franchise was then taken over by the Mondadori subsidiary, API, in 1935.

In 1945, Hugo Pratt while attending the Venice Academy of Fine Arts, created, in collaboration with Mario Faustinelli and Alberto Ongaro, Asso di Picche. Their distinctive approach to the art form earned them the name of Venetian school of comics.

In 1948 Gian Luigi Bonelli initiated a long and successful series of Western strips, starting with the popular Tex Willer. This comic would become the model for a line of publications centered around the popular comic book format that became known as Bonelliano, from the name of the publisher.

Some of the series that followed Tex Willer were Zagor (1961), Mister No (1975), and more recently, Martin Mystère (1982) and Dylan Dog (1986). These comic books presented complete stories in 100+ black-and-white pages in a pocket book format. The subject matter was always adventure, whether western, horror, mystery or science fiction. The Bonelliani are to date the most popular form of comics in the country.

Italy also produces many Disney comics, i.e., stories featuring Disney characters (from Mickey Mouse and Donald Duck universes). After the 1960s, American artists of Disney comics, such as Carl Barks and Floyd Gottfredson did not produce as many stories as in the past. At present American production of new stories has dwindled (Don Rosa publishes in Europe), and this niche has been filled by companies in South America, Denmark and Italy. The Italian 'Scuola disneyana' has produced several innovations: building the Italian standard length for stories (30 pages), reinterpreting famous works of literature in 'Parodie', writing long stories up to 400 pages.

Among the most important artists and authors are Bonvi, Marco Rota, Romano Scarpa, Giorgio Cavazzano, Giovan Battista Carpi and Guido Martina. The best known Disney character created in Italy is Paperinik (known as Duck Avenger or Phantom Duck to English audiences).

Italy also produces many comic books for children, preteens and teens: Gormiti based on a popular toy line, Angel's Friends and Winx Club based on the animated series global phenomenon.

Fashion and design 

Italian fashion has a long tradition. Milan, Florence and Rome are Italy's main fashion capitals. According to Top Global Fashion Capital Rankings 2013 by Global Language Monitor, Rome ranked sixth worldwide when Milan was twelfth. Previously, in 2009, Milan was declared as the "fashion capital of the world" by Global Language Monitor itself. Currently, Milan and Rome, annually compete with other major international centres, such as Paris, New York, London, and Tokyo. 

The Italian fashion industry is one of the country's most important manufacturing sectors. The majority of the older Italian couturiers are based in Rome. However, Milan is seen as the fashion capital of Italy because many well-known designers are based there and it is the venue for the Italian designer collections. Major Italian fashion labels, such as Gucci, Armani, Prada, Versace, Valentino, Dolce & Gabbana, Missoni, Fendi, Moschino, Max Mara, Trussardi, Benetton, and Ferragamo, to name a few, are regarded as among the finest fashion houses in the world. 

Accessory and jewelry labels, such as Bulgari, Luxottica, Buccellati have been founded in Italy and are internationally acclaimed, and Luxottica is the world's largest eyewear company. Also, the fashion magazine Vogue Italia, is considered one of the most prestigious fashion magazines in the world. The talent of young, creative fashion is also promoted, as in the ITS young fashion designer competition in Trieste.

Italy is also prominent in the field of design, notably interior design, architectural design, industrial design, and urban design. The country has produced some well-known furniture designers, such as Gio Ponti and Ettore Sottsass, and Italian phrases such as Bel Disegno and Linea Italiana have entered the vocabulary of furniture design. Examples of classic pieces of Italian white goods and pieces of furniture include Zanussi's washing machines and fridges, the "New Tone" sofas by Atrium, and the post-modern bookcase by Ettore Sottsass, inspired by Bob Dylan's song "Stuck Inside of Mobile with the Memphis Blues Again".

Italy is recognized as being a worldwide trendsetter and leader in design. Italy today still exerts a vast influence on urban design, industrial design, interior design, and fashion design worldwide. Today, Milan and Turin are the nation's leaders in architectural design and industrial design. The city of Milan hosts the FieraMilano, Europe's biggest design fair. Milan also hosts major design and architecture-related events and venues, such as the Fuori Salone and the Salone del Mobile, and has been home to the designers Bruno Munari, Lucio Fontana, Enrico Castellani, and Piero Manzoni.

Literature 

Formal Latin literature began in 240 BC, when the first stage play was performed in Rome. Latin literature was, and still is, highly influential in the world, with numerous writers, poets, philosophers, and historians, such as Pliny the Elder, Pliny the Younger, Virgil, Horace, Propertius, Ovid and Livy. The Romans were also famous for their oral tradition, poetry, drama and epigrams. In early years of the 13th century, St. Francis of Assisi was considered the first Italian poet by literary critics, with his religious song Canticle of the Sun.

Another Italian voice originated in Sicily. At the court of Emperor Frederick II, who ruled the Sicilian kingdom during the first half of the 13th century, lyrics modelled on Provençal forms and themes were written in a refined version of the local vernacular. One of these poets was the notary Giacomo da Lentini, inventor of the sonnet form, though the most famous early sonneteer was Petrarch.

Guido Guinizelli is considered the founder of the Dolce Stil Novo, a school that added a philosophical dimension to traditional love poetry. This new understanding of love, expressed in a smooth, pure style, influenced Guido Cavalcanti and the Florentine poet Dante Alighieri, who established the basis of the modern Italian language; his greatest work, the Divine Comedy, is considered among the foremost literary statements produced in Europe during the Middle Ages; furthermore, the poet invented the difficult terza rima. Two major writers of the 14th century, Petrarch and Giovanni Boccaccio, sought out and imitated the works of antiquity and cultivated their own artistic personalities. Petrarch achieved fame through his collection of poems, Il Canzoniere. Petrarch's love poetry served as a model for centuries. Equally influential was Boccaccio's The Decameron, one of the most popular collections of short stories ever written.

Italian Renaissance authors produced works including Niccolò Machiavelli's The Prince, an essay on political science and modern philosophy in which the "effectual truth" is taken to be more important than any abstract ideal; Ludovico Ariosto's Orlando Furioso, continuation of Matteo Maria Boiardo's unfinished romance Orlando Innamorato; and Baldassare Castiglione's dialogue The Book of the Courtier which describes the ideal of the perfect court gentleman and of spiritual beauty. The lyric poet Torquato Tasso in Jerusalem Delivered wrote a Christian epic in ottava rima, with attention to the Aristotelian canons of unity. Pentamerone (1634) respectively, printed some of the first known versions of fairy tales in Europe.

Giovanni Francesco Straparola and Giambattista Basile, which have written The Facetious Nights of Straparola (1550–1555) and the Pentamerone (1634) respectively, printed some of the first known versions of fairy tales in Europe. In the early 17th century, some literary masterpieces were created, such as Giambattista Marino's long mythological poem, L'Adone. The Baroque period also produced the clear scientific prose of Galileo as well as Tommaso Campanella's The City of the Sun, a description of a perfect society ruled by a philosopher-priest. At the end of the 17th century, the Arcadians began a movement to restore simplicity and classical restraint to poetry, as in Metastasio's heroic melodramas. In the 18th century, playwright Carlo Goldoni created full written plays, many portraying the middle class of his day.

The Romanticism coincided with some ideas of the Risorgimento, the patriotic movement that brought Italy political unity and freedom from foreign domination. Italian writers embraced Romanticism in the early 19th century. The time of Italy's rebirth was heralded by the poets Vittorio Alfieri, Ugo Foscolo, and Giacomo Leopardi. The works by Alessandro Manzoni, the leading Italian Romantic, are a symbol of the Italian unification for their patriotic message and because of his efforts in the development of the modern, unified Italian language; his novel The Betrothed was the first Italian historical novel to glorify Christian values of justice and Providence, and it has been called the most famous and widely read novel in the Italian language. 

In the late 19th century, a realistic literary movement called Verismo played a major role in Italian literature; Giovanni Verga and Luigi Capuana were its main exponents. In the same period, Emilio Salgari, writer of action-adventure swashbucklers and a pioneer of science fiction, published his Sandokan series. In 1883, Carlo Collodi also published the novel The Adventures of Pinocchio, the most celebrated children's classic by an Italian author and one of the most translated non-religious books in the world. A movement called Futurism influenced Italian literature in the early 20th century. Filippo Tommaso Marinetti wrote Manifesto of Futurism, called for the use of language and metaphors that glorified the speed, dynamism, and violence of the machine age. 

Modern literary figures and Nobel laureates are Gabriele D'Annunzio from 1889 to 1910, nationalist poet Giosuè Carducci in 1906, realist writer Grazia Deledda in 1926, modern theatre author Luigi Pirandello in 1936, short stories writer Italo Calvino in 1960, poets Salvatore Quasimodo in 1959 and Eugenio Montale in 1975, Umberto Eco in 1980, and satirist and theatre author Dario Fo in 1997.

Music 

From folk music to classical, music is an intrinsic part of Italian culture. Instruments associated with classical music, including the piano and violin, were invented in Italy, and many of the prevailing classical music forms, such as the symphony, concerto, and sonata, can trace their roots back to innovations of 16th- and 17th-century Italian music. 

Music writing began in Italy. Therefore, Italian words are used to tell us how music is played. Consequently, all countries have adopted technical terms in their Italian form — a demonstration of the crucial role played by Italy, and in particular Florence, in the history of music. Italian composers have played a major role in music since the Middle Ages. In the 11th century, Guido of Arezzo, an Italian monk, developed a revolutionary system of notation and method of sight-singing. The Gregorian chant, troubadour song, and the madrigal were forms in early Italian music.

Italy's most famous composers include the Renaissance composers Palestrina, Monteverdi and Gesualdo, the Baroque composers Scarlatti, Corelli and Vivaldi, the Classical composers Paisiello, Paganini and Rossini, and the Romantic composers Verdi and Puccini. Modern Italian composers such as Berio and Nono proved significant in the development of experimental and electronic music. While the classical music tradition still holds strong in Italy, as evidenced by the fame of its innumerable opera houses, such as La Scala of Milan and San Carlo of Naples (the oldest continuously active venue for public opera in the world), and performers such as the pianist Maurizio Pollini and tenor Luciano Pavarotti, Italians have been no less appreciative of their thriving contemporary music scene.

Italy is widely known for being the birthplace of opera. Italian opera was believed to have been founded in the early 17th century, in cities such as Mantua and Venice. Later, works and pieces composed by native Italian composers of the 19th and early 20th centuries, such as Rossini, Bellini, Donizetti, Verdi and Puccini, are among the most famous operas ever written and today are performed in opera houses across the world. La Scala operahouse in Milan is also renowned as one of the best in the world. Famous Italian opera singers include Enrico Caruso and Alessandro Bonci.

Introduced in the early 1920s, jazz took a particularly strong foothold in Italy, and remained popular despite the xenophobic cultural policies of the Fascist regime. Today, the most notable centres of jazz music in Italy include Milan, Rome, and Sicily. Later, Italy was at the forefront of the progressive rock and pop movement of the 1970s, with bands like PFM, Banco del Mutuo Soccorso, Le Orme, Goblin, and Pooh. The same period saw diversification in the cinema of Italy, and Cinecittà films included complex scores by composers including Ennio Morricone, Armando Trovaioli, Piero Piccioni and Piero Umiliani. In the early 1980s, the first star to emerge from the Italian hip hop scene was singer Jovanotti. Italian metal bands include Rhapsody of Fire, Lacuna Coil, Elvenking, Forgotten Tomb, and Fleshgod Apocalypse.

Italy contributed to the development of disco and electronic music, with Italo disco, known for its futuristic sound and prominent use of synthesisers and drum machines, being one of the earliest electronic dance genres, as well as European forms of disco aside from Euro disco (which later went on to influence several genres such as Eurodance and Nu-disco). By the latter half of the 1990s, a subgenre of Eurodance known as Italo dance emerged. Taking influences from Italo disco and Italo house, Italo dance generally included synthesizer riffs, a melodic sound, and the usage of vocoders. Notable Italian DJs and remixers include Gabry Ponte (member of the group Eiffel 65), Benny Benassi, Gigi D'Agostino, and the trio Tacabro.

Producers such as Giorgio Moroder, who won three Academy Awards and four Golden Globes for his music, were highly influential in the development of electronic dance music. Today, Italian pop music is represented annually with the Sanremo Music Festival, which served as inspiration for the Eurovision song contest, and the Festival of Two Worlds in Spoleto. Singers such as Andrea Bocelli, Zucchero, Eros Ramazzotti, Elisa, Tiziano Ferro and Mahmood have attained international acclaim. Some of the main international Italian pop-singers include 1970s pop-diva Mina, who sold 76 million records worldwide in her lifetime, and singer Laura Pausini, who has sold 45 million albums.

Today, the entire infrastructure that supports music as a profession is extensive in Italy, including conservatories, opera houses, radio and television stations, recording studios, music festivals, and important centers of musicological research. Musical life in Italy remains extremely active, but very Italian-centered and hardly international. Gigliola Cinquetti, Toto Cutugno, and Måneskin have won the Eurovision Song Contest, in 1964, 1990, and 2021 respectively.

La Scala opera house in Milan is renowned as one of the best in the world. There are other famous venues for opera, including San Carlo in Naples, La Fenice Theatre in Venice, and the Roman arena in Verona. Additionally, there are fifteen publicly owned theaters and numerous privately run ones in Italy. These theaters promote Italian and European plays as well as ballets. Famous Italian opera singers include Enrico Caruso, Luciano Pavarotti and Andrea Bocelli, to name a few.

Philosophy

Over the ages, Italian philosophy and literature had a vast influence on Western philosophy, beginning with the Greeks and Romans, and going onto Renaissance humanism, the Age of Enlightenment and modern philosophy. Philosophy was brought to Italy by Pythagoras, founder of the Italian school of philosophy in Crotone, Magna Graecia. Major Italian philosophers of the Greek period include Xenophanes, Parmenides, Zeno, Empedocles and Gorgias. Roman philosophers include Cicero, Lucretius, Seneca the Younger, Musonius Rufus, Plutarch, Epictetus, Marcus Aurelius, Clement of Alexandria, Sextus Empiricus, Alexander of Aphrodisias, Plotinus, Porphyry, Iamblichus, Augustine of Hippo, Philoponus of Alexandria and Boethius.

Italian Medieval philosophy was mainly Christian, and included philosophers and theologians such as Thomas Aquinas, the foremost classical proponent of natural theology and the father of Thomism, who reintroduced Aristotelian philosophy to Christianity. Notable Renaissance philosophers include: Giordano Bruno, one of the major scientific figures of the western world; Marsilio Ficino, one of the most influential humanist philosophers of the period; and Niccolò Machiavelli, one of the main founders of modern political science. Machiavelli's most famous work was The Prince, whose contribution to the history of political thought is the fundamental break between political realism and political idealism. Italy was also affected by the Enlightenment, a movement which was a consequence of the Renaissance. University cities such as Padua, Bologna and Naples remained centres of scholarship and the intellect, with several philosophers such as Giambattista Vico (widely regarded as being the founder of modern Italian philosophy) and Antonio Genovesi. Cesare Beccaria was a significant Enlightenment figure and is now considered one of the fathers of classical criminal theory as well as modern penology. Beccaria is famous for his On Crimes and Punishments (1764), a treatise that served as one of the earliest prominent condemnations of torture and the death penalty and thus a landmark work in anti-death penalty philosophy.

Italy also had a renowned philosophical movement in the 1800s, with Idealism, Sensism and Empiricism. The main Sensist Italian philosophers were Melchiorre Gioja and Gian Domenico Romagnosi. Criticism of the Sensist movement came from other philosophers such as Pasquale Galluppi (1770–1846), who affirmed that a priori relationships were synthetic. Antonio Rosmini, instead, was the founder of Italian idealism. During the late 19th and 20th centuries, there were also several other movements which gained some form of popularity in Italy, such as Ontologism (whose main philosopher was Vincenzo Gioberti), anarchism, communism, socialism, futurism, fascism and Christian democracy. Giovanni Gentile and Benedetto Croce were two of the most significant 20th-century Idealist philosophers. Anarcho-communism first fully formed into its modern strain within the Italian section of the First International. Antonio Gramsci remains a relevant philosopher within Marxist and communist theory, credited with creating the theory of cultural hegemony. Italian philosophers were also influential in the development of the non-Marxist liberal socialism philosophy, including Carlo Rosselli, Norberto Bobbio, Piero Gobetti and Aldo Capitini. In the 1960s, many Italian left-wing activists adopted the anti-authoritarian pro-working class leftist theories that would become known as autonomism and operaismo.

Early Italian feminists include Sibilla Aleramo, Alaide Gualberta Beccari, and Anna Maria Mozzoni, though proto-feminist philosophies had previously been touched upon by earlier Italian writers such as Christine de Pizan, Moderata Fonte, and Lucrezia Marinella. Italian physician and educator Maria Montessori is credited with the creation of the philosophy of education that bears her name, an educational philosophy now practiced throughout the world. Giuseppe Peano was one of the founders of analytic philosophy and contemporary philosophy of mathematics. Recent analytic philosophers include Carlo Penco, Gloria Origgi, Pieranna Garavaso and Luciano Floridi.

Science and technology 

Through the centuries, Italy has fostered the scientific community that produced many major discoveries in physics and the other sciences. During the Renaissance Italian polymaths such as Leonardo da Vinci (1452–1519), Michelangelo (1475–1564) and Leon Battista Alberti (1404–1472) made contributions in a variety of fields, including biology, architecture, and engineering. Galileo Galilei (1564–1642), an astronomer, physicist, engineer, and polymath, played a major role in the Scientific Revolution. He is considered the "father" of observational astronomy, modern physics, the scientific method, and modern science.

Other astronomers such as Giovanni Domenico Cassini (1625–1712) and Giovanni Schiaparelli (1835–1910) made discoveries about the Solar System. In mathematics, Joseph Louis Lagrange (born Giuseppe Lodovico Lagrangia, 1736–1813) was active before leaving Italy. Fibonacci (c. 1170 – c. 1250), and Gerolamo Cardano (1501–1576) made fundamental advances in mathematics. Luca Pacioli established accounting to the world. Physicist Enrico Fermi (1901–1954), a Nobel prize laureate, led the team in Chicago that developed the first nuclear reactor. He is considered the "architect of the nuclear age" and the "architect of the atomic bomb". He, Emilio G. Segrè (1905–1989) who discovered the elements technetium and astatine, and the antiproton), Bruno Rossi (1905–1993) a pioneer in Cosmic Rays and X-ray astronomy) and a number of Italian physicists were forced to leave Italy in the 1930s by Fascist laws against Jews.

Other prominent physicists include: Amedeo Avogadro (most noted for his contributions to molecular theory, in particular the Avogadro's law and the Avogadro constant), Evangelista Torricelli (inventor of barometer), Alessandro Volta (inventor of electric battery), Guglielmo Marconi (inventor of radio), Galileo Ferraris and Antonio Pacinotti, pioneers of the induction motor, Alessandro Cruto, pioneer of light bulb and Innocenzo Manzetti, eclectic pioneer of auto and robotics, Ettore Majorana (who discovered the Majorana fermions), Carlo Rubbia (1984 Nobel Prize in Physics for work leading to the discovery of the W and Z particles at CERN). Antonio Meucci is known for developing a voice-communication device which is often credited as the first telephone. Pier Giorgio Perotto in 1964 designed one of the first desktop programmable calculators, the Programma 101.

In biology, Francesco Redi has been the first to challenge the theory of spontaneous generation by demonstrating that maggots come from eggs of flies and he described 180 parasites in details and Marcello Malpighi founded microscopic anatomy, Lazzaro Spallanzani conducted research in bodily functions, animal reproduction, and cellular theory, Camillo Golgi, whose many achievements include the discovery of the Golgi complex, paved the way to the acceptance of the Neuron doctrine, Rita Levi-Montalcini discovered the nerve growth factor (awarded 1986 Nobel Prize in Physiology or Medicine). In chemistry, Giulio Natta received the Nobel Prize in Chemistry in 1963 for his work on high polymers. Giuseppe Occhialini received the Wolf Prize in Physics for the discovery of the pion or pi-meson decay in 1947. Ennio de Giorgi, a Wolf Prize in Mathematics recipient in 1990, solved Bernstein's problem about minimal surfaces and the 19th Hilbert problem on the regularity of solutions of Elliptic partial differential equations.

Laboratori Nazionali del Gran Sasso (LNGS) is the largest underground research center in the world. ELETTRA, Eurac Research, ESA Centre for Earth Observation, Institute for Scientific Interchange, International Centre for Genetic Engineering and Biotechnology, Centre for Maritime Research and Experimentation and the International Centre for Theoretical Physics conduct basic research. Trieste has the highest percentage of researchers in Europe in relation to the population. Italy was ranked 29th in the Global Innovation Index in 2021, up from 30th in 2019. There are numerous technology parks in Italy such as the Science and Technology Parks Kilometro Rosso (Bergamo), the AREA Science Park (Trieste), The VEGA-Venice Gateway for Science and Technology (Venezia), the Toscana Life Sciences (Siena), the Technology Park of Lodi Cluster (Lodi), and the Technology Park of Navacchio (Pisa), as well as science museums such as the Museo Nazionale Scienza e Tecnologia Leonardo da Vinci in Milan, the Città della Scienza in Naples and the Institute and Museum of the History of Science in Florence.

The Accademia dei Lincei is one of the oldest and most prestigious European scientific institutions, located at the Palazzo Corsini on the Via della Lungara in Rome, Italy. Founded in the Papal States in 1603 by Federico Cesi, the academy was named after the lynx, an animal whose sharp vision symbolizes the observational prowess that science requires. The country and especially the Italian Institute of Technology have produced some ingenious humanoid robots like iCub. The Italian Space Agency is a government agency established in 1988 to fund, regulate and coordinate space exploration activities in Italy. The agency cooperates with numerous national and international entities who are active in aerospace research and technology. On 15 December 1964, the first Italian satellite was launched, the San Marco 1, while on 31 July 1992, Franco Malerba, following the STS-46 space mission, was the first Italian to go into space. On 23 November 2014 Samantha Cristoforetti, following the Expedition 42 mission, was the first Italian woman to go into space.

Sculpture 

The art of sculpture in the Italian peninsula has its roots in ancient times. In the archaic period, when Etruscan cities dominated central Italy and the adjacent sea, Etruscan sculpture flourished. The name of an individual artist, Vulca, who worked at Veii, has been identified. He has left a terracotta Apollo and other figures, and can perhaps claim the distinction of being the most ancient master in the long history of Italian art.

A significant development of this art occurred between the 6th century BC and 5th century AD during the growth of the Roman Empire. The earliest Roman sculpture was influenced by the Etruscans to the north of Rome and by Greek colonists to the south. During the Empire period, the pure realism of the Republican period portrait busts was joined to Greek idealism. The result, evident in Augustus of Primaporta, was often a curious juxtaposition of individualized heads with idealized, anatomically perfect bodies in Classical poses.

During the Middle Ages, large sculpture was largely religious. Carolingian artists (named after Charlemagne's family) in northern Italy created sculpture for covers of Bibles, as decoration for parts of church altars, and for crucifixes and giant candlesticks placed on altars.

In the late 13th century, Nicola Pisano and his son Giovanni began the revolutionary changes that led up to the Renaissance in Italian sculpture, drawing influences from Roman sarcophagi and other remains. Both are noted for their reliefs and ornamentation on pulpits. The Massacre of the Innocents by Giovanni Pisano is an example.

The greatest sculptor of the early Renaissance was Donatello. In 1430, he had produced a bronze statue of David, which reestablished the classical idea of beauty in the naked human body. Conceived fully in the round and independent of any architectural surroundings, it was the first major work of Renaissance sculpture. Among the other brilliant sculptors of the 15th century were Jacopo della Quercia, Michelozzo, Bernardo and Antonio Rossellino, Giambologna  and Agostino di Duccio.

Michelangelo's great brooding sculptures, such as the figures of Night and Day in the Medici Chapel in Florence, dominated High Renaissance Italian sculpture. His David, is perhaps, the most famous sculpture in the world. It differs from previous representations of the subject in that David is depicted before his battle with Goliath and not after the giant's defeat. Instead of being shown victorious over a foe much larger than he, David looks tense and ready for combat.

Gian Lorenzo Bernini was the most important sculptor of the Baroque period. He combined emotional and sensual freedom with theatrical presentation and an almost photographic naturalism. Bernini's saints and other figures seem to sit, stand, and move as living people — and the viewer becomes part of the scene. This involvement of the spectator is a basic characteristic of Baroque sculpture. One of his most famous works is Ecstasy of Saint Teresa.

The Neoclassical movement arose in the late 18th century. The members of this very international school restored what they regarded as classical principles of art. They were direct imitators of ancient Greek sculptors, and emphasized classical drapery and the nude. The leading Neoclassical artist in Italy, was Antonio Canova, who like many other foreign neoclassical sculptors including Bertel Thorvaldsen was based in Rome. His ability to carve pure white Italian marble has seldom been equaled. Most of his statues are in European collections, but the Metropolitan Museum of Art in New York City owns important works, including Perseus and Cupid and Psyche.

In the 20th century, many Italians played leading roles in the development of modern art. Futurist sculptors tried to show how space, movement, and time affected form. These artists portrayed objects in motion, rather than their appearance at any particular moment. An example is Umberto Boccioni's Unique Forms of Continuity in Space.

Theatre 

Italian theatre originates from the Middle Ages, with its background dating back to the times of the ancient Greek colonies of Magna Graecia, in Southern Italy, the theatre of the Italic peoples and the theatre of ancient Rome. It can therefore be assumed that there were two main lines of which the ancient Italian theatre developed in the Middle Ages. The first, consisting of the dramatization of Catholic liturgies and of which more documentation is retained, and the second, formed by pagan forms of spectacle such as the staging for city festivals, the court preparations of the jesters and the songs of the troubadours. The Renaissance theatre marked the beginning of the modern theatre due to the rediscovery and study of the classics, the ancient theatrical texts were recovered and translated, which were soon staged at the court and in the curtensi halls, and then moved to real theatre. In this way the idea of ​​theatre came close to that of today: a performance in a designated place in which the public participates. In the late 15th century two cities were important centers for the rediscovery and renewal of theatrical art: Ferrara and Rome. The first, vital center of art in the second half of the fifteenth century, saw the staging of some of the most famous Latin works by Plautus, rigorously translated into Italian.

During the 16th century and on into the 18th century, Commedia dell'arte was a form of improvisational theatre, and it is still performed today. Travelling troupes of players would set up an outdoor stage and provide amusement in the form of juggling, acrobatics and, more typically, humorous plays based on a repertoire of established characters with a rough storyline, called canovaccio. Plays did not originate from written drama but from scenarios called lazzi, which were loose frameworks that provided the situations, complications, and outcome of the action, around which the actors would improvise. The characters of the commedia usually represent fixed social types and stock characters, each of which has a distinct costume, such as foolish old men, devious servants, or military officers full of false bravado. The main categories of these characters include servants, old men, lovers, and captains.

By the mid-16th century, specific troupes of commedia performers began to coalesce, and by 1568 the Gelosi became a distinct company. Commedia often performed inside in court theatres or halls, and also as some fixed theatres such as Teatro Baldrucca in Florence. Flaminio Scala, who had been a minor performer in the Gelosi published the scenarios of the Commedia dell'arte around the start of the 17th century, really in an effort to legitimise the form—and ensure its legacy.

In Commedia dell'arte, female roles were played by women, documented as early as the 1560s, making them the first known professional actresses in Europe since antiquity. Lucrezia Di Siena, whose name is on a contract of actors from 10 October 1564, has been referred to as the first Italian actress known by name, with Vincenza Armani and Barbara Flaminia as the first primadonnas and the first well documented actresses in Europe.

The Ballet dance genre also originated in Italy. It began during the Italian Renaissance court as an outgrowth of court pageantry, where aristocratic weddings were lavish celebrations. Court musicians and dancers collaborated to provide elaborate entertainment for them. Domenico da Piacenza was one of the first dancing masters. Along with his students, Antonio Cornazzano and Guglielmo Ebreo, he was trained in dance and responsible for teaching nobles the art. Da Piacenza left one work: De arte saltandi et choreus ducendi (On the art of dancing and conducting dances), which was put together by his students.

At first, ballets were woven in to the midst of an opera to allow the audience a moment of relief from the dramatic intensity. By the mid-seventeenth century, Italian ballets in their entirety were performed in between the acts of an opera. Over time, Italian ballets became part of theatrical life: ballet companies in Italy's major opera houses employed an average of four to twelve dancers; in 1815 many companies employed anywhere from eighty to one hundred dancers.

Carlo Goldoni, who wrote a few scenarios starting in 1734, superseded the comedy of masks and the comedy of intrigue by representations of actual life and manners through the characters and their behaviours. He rightly maintained that Italian life and manners were susceptible of artistic treatment such as had not been given them before. Italian theatre has been active in producing contemporary European work and in staging revivals, including the works of Luigi Pirandello and Dario Fo.

The Teatro di San Carlo in Naples is the oldest continuously active venue for public opera in the world, opening in 1737, decades before both the Milan's La Scala and Venice's La Fenice theatres.

Visual art 

The history of Italian visual arts is significant to the history of Western painting. Since ancient times, Greeks, Etruscans and Celts have inhabited the south, centre and north of the Italian peninsula respectively. The very numerous rock drawings in Valcamonica are as old as 8,000 BC, and there are rich remains of Etruscan art.

Roman art was influenced by Greece and can in part be taken as a descendant of ancient Greek painting. Roman painting does have its own unique characteristics. The only surviving Roman paintings are wall paintings, many from villas in Campania, in Southern Italy. Such paintings can be grouped into four main "styles" or periods and may contain the first examples of trompe-l'œil, pseudo-perspective, and pure landscape.

Panel painting becomes more common during the Romanesque period, under the heavy influence of Byzantine icons. Towards the middle of the 13th century, Medieval art and Gothic painting became more realistic, with the beginnings of interest in the depiction of volume and perspective in Italy with Cimabue and then his pupil Giotto. From Giotto onwards, the treatment of composition in painting became much more free and innovative.

The Italian Renaissance is said by many to be the golden age of painting; roughly spanning the 14th through the mid-17th centuries with a significant influence also out of the borders of modern Italy. In Italy artists like Paolo Uccello, Fra Angelico, Masaccio, Piero della Francesca, Andrea Mantegna, Filippo Lippi, Giorgione, Tintoretto, Sandro Botticelli, Leonardo da Vinci, Michelangelo Buonarroti, Raphael, Giovanni Bellini, and Titian took painting to a higher level through the use of perspective, the study of human anatomy and proportion, and through their development of refined drawing and painting techniques. 

In the 15th and 16th centuries, the High Renaissance gave rise to a stylised art known as Mannerism. In place of the balanced compositions and rational approach to perspective that characterised art at the dawn of the 16th century, the Mannerists sought instability, artifice, and doubt. The unperturbed faces and gestures of Piero della Francesca and the calm Virgins of Raphael are replaced by the troubled expressions of Pontormo and the emotional intensity of El Greco.

In the 17th century, among the greatest painters of Italian Baroque are Caravaggio, Annibale Carracci, Artemisia Gentileschi, Mattia Preti, Carlo Saraceni and Bartolomeo Manfredi. Subsequently, in the 18th century, Italian Rococo was mainly inspired by French Rococo, since France was the founding nation of that particular style, with artists such as Giovanni Battista Tiepolo and Canaletto.

In the 19th century, major Italian Romantic painters were Francesco Hayez, Giuseppe Bezzuoli and Francesco Podesti. Impressionism was brought from France to Italy by the Macchiaioli, led by Giovanni Fattori, and Giovanni Boldini; Realism by Gioacchino Toma and Giuseppe Pellizza da Volpedo. In the 20th century, with Futurism, primarily through the works of Umberto Boccioni and Giacomo Balla, Italy rose again as a seminal country for artistic evolution in painting. Futurism was succeeded by the metaphysical paintings of Giorgio de Chirico, who exerted a strong influence on the Surrealists and generations of artists to follow like Bruno Caruso and Renato Guttuso.

Metaphysical painting is an Italian art movement, born in 1917 with the work of Carlo Carrà and Giorgio de Chirico in Ferrara. The word metaphysical, adopted by De Chirico himself, is core to the poetics of the movement. Novecento movement, group of Italian artists, formed in 1922 in Milan, that advocated a return to the great Italian representational art of the past. The founding members of the Novecento (Italian: 20th-century) movement were the critic Margherita Sarfatti and seven artists: Anselmo Bucci, Leonardo Dudreville, Achille Funi, Gian Emilio Malerba, Piero Marussig, Ubaldo Oppi, and Mario Sironi.

Spatialism was founded by the Italian artist Lucio Fontana as the movimento spaziale, its tenets were repeated in manifestos between 1947 and 1954. Combining elements of concrete art, dada and tachism, the movement's adherents rejected easel painting and embraced new technological developments, seeking to incorporate time and movement in their works. Fontana's slashed and pierced paintings exemplify his theses. Arte Povera is an artistic movement that originated in Italy in the 1960s, combining aspects of conceptual, minimalist, and performance art, and making use of worthless or common materials such as earth or newspaper, in the hope of subverting the commercialization of art. 

Transavantgarde is the Italian version of Neo-expressionism, an art movement that swept through Italy and the rest of Western Europe in the late 1970s and 1980s. The term transavanguardia was coined by the Italian art critic, Achille Bonito Oliva, originating in the "Aperto '80" at the Venice Biennale, and literally means beyond the avant-garde.

Cuisine and meal structure 

Italian cuisine is a Mediterranean cuisine consisting of the ingredients, recipes and cooking techniques developed across the Italian Peninsula since antiquity, and later spread around the world together with waves of Italian diaspora. Italian cuisine includes deeply rooted traditions common to the whole country, as well as all the regional gastronomies, different from each other, especially between the north, the centre and the south of Italy, which are in continuous exchange. Many dishes that were once regional have proliferated with variations throughout the country. Italian cuisine offers an abundance of taste, and has influenced several other cuisines around the world, chiefly that of the United States.

One of the main characteristics of Italian cuisine is its simplicity, with many dishes made up of few ingredients, and therefore Italian cooks often rely on the quality of the ingredients, rather than the complexity of preparation. The most popular dishes and recipes, over the centuries, have often been created by ordinary people more so than by chefs, which is why many Italian recipes are suitable for home and daily cooking, respecting regional specificities, privileging only raw materials and ingredients from the region of origin of the dish and preserving its seasonality. 

Italian cuisine has developed through centuries of social and political changes, it has its roots in ancient Rome. Artichokes, peas, lettuce, parsley, melons, and apples, as well as wine and cheese, many kinds of meat, and grains were all enjoyed by ancient Romans. For feasts Roman cooks used many spices, developed recipes for cheesecake and omelets, and roasted all types of meat. From this noble beginning a sophisticated and flavorful cuisine has emerged. Significant changes occurred with the discovery of the New World and the introduction of potatoes, tomatoes, bell peppers and maize, now central to the cuisine but not introduced in quantity until the 18th century.

Italian cuisine, like other facets of the culture, speaks with highly inflected regional accents. There are certain self-consciously national constants: spaghetti with tomato sauce and pizza are highly common, but this nationalisation of culinary identity didn't start to take hold until after the Second World War, when southern immigrants flooded to the north in search of work, and even those classics vary from place to place; small enclaves still hold fast to their unique local forms of pasta and particular preparations. Classics such as Pasta e fagioli, while found everywhere, are prepared differently according to local traditions. Gastronomic explorations of Italy are best undertaken by knowing the local traditions and eating the local foods.

Northern Italy, mountainous in many parts, is notable for the alpine cheeses of the Valle d'Aosta, the pesto of Liguria, and, in Piedmonte, the Alba truffle. In the Alto Adige, the influence of neighboring Austria may be found in a regional repertoire that includes speck and dumplings. In the north, risotto and polenta have tended to serve the staple function taken by pasta across the rest of the country. Italy's center includes the celebrated culinary regions of Tuscany — famous for its olive oil and bean dishes — and Emilia-Romagna — home of prosciutto di Parma, parmigiano-reggiano, and ragù — the latter now produced (and traduced) worldwide as spaghetti alla bolognese. Southern Italy includes the hearty food of Lazio in which meat and offal frequently figure, but also the vegetable-focused fare of Basilicata, historically one of Italy's poorest regions. The islands of Sicily and Sardinia have distinctively different foodways. The former is notable for its many sweet dishes, seafood, and citrus fruit, while Sardinia has traditionally looked to its hilly and mountainous interior with a cuisine centered on lamb, suckling pig, breads, and cheese.

It is in the food of Naples and Campania, however, that many visitors would recognize the foods that have come to be regarded as quintessentially Italian: pizza, spaghetti with tomato sauce, aubergine parmigiana, although the origins of all three dishes are claimed by Sicily (Pizza originating in Palermo). 

Also, Italy exports and produces the highest level of wine, exporting over 2.38 million tonnes in 2011. , Italy was responsible for producing approximately one-fifth of the world's wine. Some Italian regions are home to some of the oldest wine-producing traditions in the world. Etruscans and Greek settlers produced wine in the country long before the Romans started developing their own vineyards in the 2nd century BC. Roman grape-growing and winemaking was prolific and well-organized, pioneering large-scale production and storage techniques like barrel -making and bottling. Famous and traditional Italian wines include Barbaresco, Barbera, Barolo, Brunello di Montalcino, Chianti, Corvina, Dolcetto and Nero d'Avola, to name a few.

The country is also famous for its gelato, or traditional ice-cream often known as Italian ice cream abroad. There are gelaterias or ice-cream vendors and shops all around Italian cities, and it is a very popular dessert or snack, especially during the summer. Sicilian granitas, or a frozen dessert of flavored crushed ice, more or less similar to a sorbet or a snow cone, are popular desserts not only in Sicily or their native towns of Messina and Catania, but all over Italy (even though the Northern and Central Italian equivalent, the gratta checca, commonly found in Rome or Milan is slightly different from the traditional granita siciliana). Italy also boasts an assortment of desserts. 

The Christmas cakes pandoro and panettone are popular in the North (pandoro is from Verona, whilst panettone is milanese), however, they have also become popular desserts in other parts of Italy and abroad. The Colomba Pasquale is eaten all over the country on Easter day, and is a more traditional alternative to chocolate easter eggs. Tiramisu is a very popular and iconic Italian dessert from Veneto which has become famous worldwide. Other Italian cakes and sweets include cannoli, the cassata siciliana, fruit-shaped marzipans and panna cotta.

Coffee, and more specifically espresso, has become highly important to the cuisine of Italy. Cappuccino is also a famous Italian coffee drink, which is usually sweeter and less dark than espresso, and can be served with foam or cream on top, on which chocolate powder and sugar is usually sprinkled. Caffelatte is a mixture of coffee and milk, and is usually drunk at breakfast time (unlike most other Italian coffee-types, children and adults drink it alike, since it is lighter and more milky than normal coffee). The Bicerin is Turin's own coffee. It is a mix between cappuccino and normal hot chocolate, and is made with equal amounts of drinking chocolate, coffee and a slight addition of milk and creamy foam.

Italian meal structure is typical of the European Mediterranean region and differs from North, Central, and Eastern European meal structure, though it still often consists of breakfast (colazione), lunch (pranzo), and supper (cena). However, much less emphasis is placed on breakfast, and breakfast itself is often skipped or involves lighter meal portions than are seen in non-Mediterranean Western countries. Late-morning and mid-afternoon snacks, called merenda (plural merende), are also often included in this meal structure.

Italian cuisine is one of the most popular and copied around the world. The lack or total unavailability of some of its most characteristic ingredients outside of Italy, also and above all to falsifications (or food fraud), leads to the complete denaturalization of Italian ingredients. This phenomenon, widespread in all continents, is better known as Italian Sounding, consisting in the use of words as well as images, colour combinations (the Italian tricolour), geographical references, brands evocative of Italy to promote and market agri-food products which in reality have nothing to do with Italian cuisine.

Education 

Education in Italy is free and mandatory from ages six to sixteen, and consists of five stages: kindergarten (scuola dell'infanzia), primary school (scuola primaria), lower secondary school (scuola secondaria di primo grado), upper secondary school (scuola secondaria di secondo grado) and university (università).

Primary education lasts eight years. Students are given a basic education in Italian, English, mathematics, natural sciences, history, geography, social studies, physical education and visual and musical arts. Secondary education lasts for five years and includes three traditional types of schools focused on different academic levels: the liceo prepares students for university studies with a classical or scientific curriculum, while the istituto tecnico and the Istituto professionale prepare pupils for vocational education.

In 2018, the Italian secondary education was evaluated as below the OECD average. Italy scored below the OECD average in reading and science, and near OECD average in mathematics. Mean performance in Italy declined in reading and science, and remained stable in mathematics. Trento and Bolzano scored at an above the national average in reading. Compared to school children in other OECD countries, children in Italy missed out on a greater amount of learning due to absences and indiscipline in classrooms. A wide gap exists between northern schools, which perform near average, and schools in the South, that had much poorer results.

Tertiary education in Italy is divided between public universities, private universities and the prestigious and selective superior graduate schools, such as the Scuola Normale Superiore di Pisa. 33 Italian universities were ranked among the world's top 500 in 2019, the third-largest number in Europe after the United Kingdom and Germany. Bologna University, founded in 1088, is the oldest university in continuous operation, and the first university in the sense of a higher-learning and degree-awarding institute, as the word universitas was coined at its foundation, as well as one of the leading academic institutions in Italy and Europe. The Sapienza University of Rome, founded with the Papal bull In supremae praeminentia dignitatis issued on 20 April 1303 by Pope Boniface VIII, is the largest EU university by enrollments and at the same time it is present in all major international university rankings.

Milan's Bocconi University, has been ranked among the top 20 best business schools in the world by The Wall Street Journal international rankings, especially thanks to its Master of Business Administration program, which in 2007 placed it no. 17 in the world in terms of graduate recruitment preference by major multinational companies. Also, Forbes has ranked Bocconi no. 1 worldwide in the specific category Value for Money. In May 2008, Bocconi overtook several traditionally top global business schools in the Financial Times executive education ranking, reaching no. 5 in Europe and no. 15 in the world. Other top universities and polytechnics include the Polytechnic University of Milan and Polytechnic University of Turin.

In 2009 an Italian research ranked the Sapienza University of Rome and the University of Milan  as the best in Italy (over indicators such as scientific production, attraction of foreign students, and others), whose research and teaching activities have developed over the years and have received important international recognitions. The University of Milan is the only Italian member of the League of European Research Universities, a prestigious group of twenty research-intensive European Universities. Sapienza is member of several international groups, as: European Spatial Development Planning, Partnership of a European Group of Aeronautics and Space Universities, CINECA, Santander Network, Institutional Network of the Universities from the Capitals of Europe, Mediterranean Universities Union.

Folklore and mythology

Folklore of Italy refers to the folklore and urban legends of Italy. On the Italian territory, in fact, different peoples have followed one another over time, each of which has left its traces in the popular imagination. Some tales also come from Christianization, especially those concerning demons, which are sometimes recognized by Christian demonology.

In Italian folklore, the Befana is an old woman who delivers gifts to children throughout Italy on Epiphany Eve (the night of January 5) in a similar way to Santa Claus or the Three Magi Kings. A popular belief is that her name derives from the Feast of Epiphany. In popular folklore, the Befana visits all the children of Italy on the eve of the Feast of the Epiphany to fill their socks with candy and presents if they are good, or a lump of coal or dark candy if they are bad. In many poorer parts of Italy and in particular rural Sicily, a stick in a stocking was placed instead of coal.  Being a good housekeeper, many say she will sweep the floor before she leaves. To some the sweeping meant the sweeping away of the problems of the year.  The child's family typically leaves a small glass of wine and a plate with a few morsels of food, often regional or local, for the Befana.

The Badalisc is a mythical creature of the Val Camonica, Italy, in the southern central Alps. The Badalisc is represented today as a creature with a big head covered with a goat skin, two small horns, a huge mouth and glowing eyes. According to legend the Badalisc lives in the woods around the village of Andrista (comune of Cevo) and is supposed to annoy the community: each year it is captured during the period of Epiphany (5 & 6 January) and led on a rope into the village by musicians and masked characters, including il giovane (the young man), il vecchio (the old man), la vecchia (the old woman) and the young signorina, who is "bait" for the animal's lust. There are also some old witches, who beat drums, and bearded shepherds, and a hunchback (un torvo gobetto) who has a "rustic duel" with the animal. Traditionally only men take part, although some are dressed as women. In medieval times women were prohibited from participating in the exhibition, or even to see or hear the Badalisc's Speech; if they did so they would be denied Holy Communion the following day.

An egg of Columbus refers to a brilliant idea or discovery that seems simple or easy after the fact. The expression refers to an apocryphal story, dating from at least the 16th century, in which it is said that Christopher Columbus, having been told that finding a new trade route was inevitable and no great accomplishment, challenges his critics to make an egg stand on its tip. After his challengers give up, Columbus does it himself by tapping the egg on the table to flatten its tip. The story is often alluded to when discussing creativity. The term has also been used as the trade name of a tangram puzzle and several mechanical puzzles. It also shows that anything can be done by anyone with the right set of skills; however, not everyone knows how to do it.

Alberto da Giussano is a legendary character of the 12th century who would have participated, as a protagonist, in the battle of Legnano on 29 May 1176. In reality, according to historians, the actual military leader of the Lombard League in the famous military battle with Frederick Barbarossa was Guido da Landriano. Historical analyses made over time have indeed shown that the figure of Alberto da Giussano never existed. In the past, historians, attempting to find a real confirmation, hypothesized the identification of his figure with Albertus de Carathe (Alberto da Carate) and Albertus Longus (Alberto Longo), both among the Milanese who signed the pact in Cremona in March 1167 which established the Lombard League, or in an Alberto da Giussano mentioned in an appeal of 1196 presented to Pope Celestine III on the administration of the church-hospital of San Sempliciano. These, however, are all weak identifications, given that they lack clear and convincing historical confirmation.

The Val Camonica witch trials were two large witch trials which took place in Val Camonica in Italy, in 1505–1510 and 1518–1521. They were among the biggest Italian witch trials, and caused the deaths of about 60 persons, in each trial: 110 in total. The best source for the trials is considered to be the Venetian Marin Sanudo, who was the chronicler to the Council of Ten from 1496 to 1536. The documentary evidence was destroyed by order of Giacinto Gaggia, the bishop of Brescia, to prevent it from being used by the anticlerical opposition.

Italian folk dance has been an integral part of Italian culture for centuries.  Dance has been a continuous thread in Italian life from Dante through the Renaissance, the advent of the tarantella in Southern Italy, and the modern revivals of folk music and dance. One of the earliest attempts to systematically collect folk dances is Gaspare Ungarelli's 1894 work Le vecchie danze italiane ancora in uso nella provincia bolognese ("Old Italian dances still in use in the province of Bologna") which gives brief descriptions and music for some 30 dances. An interest in preserving and fostering folk art, music and dance among Italian Americans and the dedication and leadership of Elba Farabegoli Gurzau led to the formation of the Italian Folk Art Federation of America (IFAFA) in May 1979. The group sponsors an annual conference and has published a newsletter, Tradizioni, since 1980.

Italian folk music has a deep and complex history. National unification came quite late to the Italian peninsula, so its many hundreds of separate cultures remained un-homogenized until quite recently. Moreover, Italian folk music reflects Italy's geographic position at the south of Europe and in the center of the Mediterranean Sea: Celtic, Slavic, Arabic, Greek, Spanish and Byzantine influences are readily apparent in the musical styles of the Italian regions. Today, Italy's folk music is often divided into several spheres of geographic influence, a classification system proposed by Alan Lomax in 1956 and often repeated since.

Mythology of Italy refers to the mythology of people living in Italy. Major pantheons belong to Roman mythology and Etruscan mythology. Roman mythology is the body of myths of ancient Rome as represented in the literature and visual arts of the Romans. One of a wide variety of genres of Roman folklore, Roman mythology may also refer to the modern study of these representations, and to the subject matter as represented in the literature and art of other cultures in any period. Roman mythology draws from the mythology of the Italic peoples and ultimately from Proto-Indo-European mythology. Roman mythology also draws directly on Greek mythology, potentially as early as Rome's protohistory, but primarily during the Hellenistic period of Greek influence and through the Roman conquest of Greece, via the artistic imitation of Greek literary models by Roman authors.

Health

Life expectancy in the country is 80 for males and 85 for females, placing the country 5th in the world for life expectancy. In comparison to other Western countries, Italy has a relatively low rate of adult obesity (below 10%), as there are several health benefits of the Mediterranean diet. The proportion of daily smokers was 22% in 2012, down from 24.4% in 2000 but still slightly above the OECD average. Smoking in public places including bars, restaurants, night clubs and offices has been restricted to specially ventilated rooms since 2005. In 2013, UNESCO added the Mediterranean diet to the Representative List of the Intangible Cultural Heritage of Humanity of Italy (promoter), Morocco, Spain, Portugal, Greece, Cyprus and Croatia.

The Italian state runs a universal public healthcare system since 1978. However, healthcare is provided to all citizens and residents by a mixed public-private system. The public part is the Servizio Sanitario Nazionale, which is organised under the Ministry of Health and administered on a devolved regional basis. Healthcare spending accounted for 9.7% of GDP in 2020. Italy's healthcare system is consistently ranked among the best in the world. In 2018 Italy's healthcare is ranked 20th in Europe in the Euro Health Consumer Index.

Italian culture 

Italy is the wellspring of Western civilization and has been a world crossroads for over 2,000 years. Continuous learning, creativity, and technological advancement on the Italian peninsula have shaped virtually every aspect of Western culture.

Though its archaeological record stretches back tens of thousands of years, Italian history begins with the Etruscans, an ancient civilization that rose between the Arno and Tiber rivers. At that time, Italy was a hodgepodge of peoples and languages. They included the Celts in the north, Greek colonists in southern Italy, and such mountain peoples as the Sabines and the Samnites. In addition, the Phoenicians, who were great sea traders, established colonies throughout the Mediterranean region, including settlements on the islands of Sicily and Sardinia.

The Etruscans and the other inhabitants of the peninsula were supplanted in the 3rd century BC by the Romans, who soon became the chief power in the Mediterranean world and whose empire stretched from Iraq to Scotland by the 2nd century AD. The empire influenced the government, the arts, and the architecture of many later groups of people.

With Emperor Constantine's conversion to Christianity in 312, Rome became the open and official seat of the Catholic Church, and Italy has had a profound effect on the development of Christianity and of Western concepts of faith and morality ever since. Like the other works of Christian charity, the care of the sick was from the beginning a sacred duty for each of the faithful, but it devolved in a special way upon the bishops, presbyters, and deacons. According to historian William Lecky, the hospitals were unknown before Christianity. After the fall of Rome in the 5th century, the Italian peninsula was divided among many different rulers.

During the Middle Ages, which lasted from about the 5th century through the 15th century, the Roman Catholic Church replaced the Roman Empire as the unifying force in Europe. It used the Latin language and preserved the classics of Latin literature. In addition, the influence of the Church on the spread of literacy has had a significant impact on European society. Günther S. Wegener has carefully documented the correlation between Bible translation and the spread of literacy in European languages. In fact, during the Middle Ages, the most important branch of learning was theology (the study of God). This new intellectual approach has been called Scholasticism. Italy, in virtue of this, became a seat of great formal learning in 1088 with the establishment of the University of Bologna, the first university in Europe. Other Italian universities soon followed.

Among the eminent personalities of the Christian world during the Middle Ages, perhaps the most important was that of Benedict of Nursia. His formula ora et labora, influenced the idea of work in Western monasticism and indirectly prepared the way for our modern high esteem of labor. For the development of their ideas about purgatory western theologians relied heavily on the authority of Pope Gregory I. In a society — like that of medieval Europe — deeply found on religion, change the geography of the other world means to operate on a real mind revolution, it means to change life itself.

In Italy medieval communes were sworn associations of townsmen that arose during the 11th century to overthrow the rule of the local bishop or feudal magnates. The communal experience of medieval Italy was somehow salient for the origins of modern democracy. Many cities — especially Florence, Genoa, Pisa, Milan, and Venice — became powerful and independent city-states. An intellectual revival, stimulated in part by the freer atmosphere of the cities and in part by the rediscovery of ancient Greek and Latin writings, gave rise to the humanist attitudes and ideas that formed the basis of the Renaissance.

Renaissance period saw a rebirth of many interests, particularly in the arts. By the early 15th century, in Florence, a circle of architects, painters, and sculptors have sought to revive classical art. The leader of this group was an architect, Filippo Brunelleschi. He designed churches reflecting classical models. To him we also owe a scientific discovery of the first importance in the history of art: the rules of perspective. In painting, Leonardo da Vinci and other Italian painters used a technique called sfumato that created softness in their portraits. At the same time, Italy witnessed the revival of the fresco. In music, both the small-scale madrigal and the large-scale opera were inventions of the period with a long future. Italian cities invented the modern conservatory to train professional musicians, as they invented the art academy as a place to master the techniques and the theory of painting, sculpture, and architecture. Rome and Venice witnessed the emergence of the first art "market" where buyers and sellers exchanged artworks as commodities.

It was no accident that the origin of the European system of banks was born in Renaissance Italy. By the 1430s, the Medici family dominated the ruling class of Florence. The family controlled the largest bank in Europe and was headed by a series of talented and ambitious men. Under Medici domination, the Florentine republic in some ways resembled a signorial government.

Some of the greatest explorers of the late 15th century and early 16th century were Italians exposed to the traditions of the Renaissance. Christopher Columbus — like such other Italian explorers as John Cabot, Giovanni da Verrazzano, and Amerigo Vespucci — was willing to take enormous risks to achieve results that people had never dreamed of. In a sense, Columbus's arrival in America in 1492 was one of the greatest achievements of the Renaissance.

In general terms, the Baroque era is sometimes called the era of genius, since it was at this time in history that the scientific revolution that established the foundations of modern science was launched. In the pantheon of the scientific revolution, Galileo Galilei takes a high position because of his pioneering use of quantitative experiments with results analyzed mathematically.

The intellectual dynamism in 18th century Italy was considerable, across the gamut of genres. Italian elites became conversant with French Enlightenment principles and with English ideas, too, spread by young aristocrats on the grand tour. By the 1760s and 1770s, the Italian authors who were members of academies and contributors to philosophical and literary journals began to disseminate their ideas close to the realm of power in Milan and Turin, Parma and Modena, Florence and Naples. Important representatives of the Italian Enlightenment were Pietro Verri, Pietro Giannone, and Philip Mazzei, a close friend of Thomas Jefferson, who spent many years in America and had an indirect influence on the drafting of the Declaration of Independence. Inspired by Cesare Beccaria's theses — on liberal ideas and humanitarian sentiments — the Grand Duchy of Tuscany was the first state in the world to abolish the death penalty in 1786.

Italy continued its leading cultural role through the Romantic period, when its dominance in painting and sculpture diminished and it reestablished a strong presence in music. For example, the great vocal tradition of 19th-century European opera was bel canto, which simply means "beautiful singing." At the same time Italy was forming itself into one nation, the period called the Risorgimento.

Italian artists have been quite influential in the 20th century, and some of the Italian exponents of Modernism in the 1920s and 1930s continue to have a strong presence in the international contemporary art market. A new movement called Fascism, led by Benito Mussolini, a former Socialist, grew increasingly popular. Italian Fascism became a model for similar movements in Europe and Latin America. The nationalism of Italian Fascism was culturally based. The parties and organizations associated with these leaders also adopted the Roman salute.

Known in many circles as the father of the Atomic Age, Enrico Fermi was an Italian who bore witness to the discovery, control, and use of atomic power. Following World War II, Italian neorealism became an important force in motion pictures, and by the 1960s, Italy had established itself as one of a handful of great European film cultures. In the same years, the country has also been central to the formation of the European Union. Today Italy is one of the international leaders in fashion and design.

Italophilia 

If the origins of the western intellectual heritage go back to the Greeks and, less directly, to the peoples of Egypt and the Near East, the contribution of Rome to the wider spreading of Western Civilization was tremendous. In fields such as language, law, politics, religion, and art Roman culture continues to affect our lives. Rome was the center of an empire that stretched across a large segment of the then-known world, and later became the center of the Christian faith. Ancient Italy is identified with Rome and the so-called Romanophilia.

Despite the fall of the Roman Empire, its legacy continued to have a significant impact on the cultural and political life in Europe. For the medieval mind, Rome came to constitute a central dimension of the European traditionalist sensibility. The idealisation of this Empire as the symbol of universal order led to the construction of the Holy Roman Empire. Writing before the outbreak of the First World War, the historian Alexander Carlyle noted that "we can without difficulty recognize" not only "the survival of the tradition of the ancient empire" but also a "form of the perpetual aspiration to make real the dream of the universal commonwealth of humanity."

During much of the Middle Ages (about the 5th century through the 15th century), the Roman Catholic Church had great political power in Western Europe. Throughout its history, the Catholic faith has inspired many great works of architecture, art, literature, and music. These works include French medieval Gothic cathedrals, the Italian artist Michelangelo's frescoes in the Vatican, the Italian writer Dante's epic poem The Divine Comedy, and the Austrian composer Wolfgang Amadeus Mozart's Requiem.

As for Italian artists they were in demand almost all over Europe. Torrigiano and Zuccari worked in England, Masolino in Hungary, Luca Cambiasi and Pellegrino Tibaldi in Spain, Jacopo Sansovino in Portugal, Morando and others in Poland. The demand seems to have been greatest in France, more especially at the French court, which employed (among others) Leonardo da Vinci, Rosso, Primaticcio, Niccolò dell'Abbate and Sebastiano Serlio. Italian craftsmen were engaged to work on building sites from Munich to Zamość. Italian actors performed at the courts of France, Spain, Poland and elsewhere.

 

The Italian language was fashionable, at court for example, as well as Italian literature and art. The famous lexicographer John Florio of Italian origin was the most important humanist in Renaissance England. and contributed to the English language with over 1,969 words. William Shakespeare's works show an important level of Italophilia, a deep knowledge of Italy and the Italian culture, like in Romeo and Juliet and The Merchant of Venice. According to Robin Kirkpatrick, Professor of Italian and English Literatures at Cambridge University, Shakespeare shared "with his contemporaries and immediate forebears a fascination with Italy." In 16th century Spain, cultural italophilia was also widespread (while the Spanish influence in Southern Italy was also great) and the king Philip IV himself considered Italian as his favorite foreign language.

The movement of "international Italophilia" around 1600 certainly held the German territories in its sway, with one statistic suggesting that up to a third of all books available in Germany in the early 17th century were in Italian. Themes and styles from il pastor fido were adapted endlessly by German artists, including Opitz, who wrote several poems based on Guarini's text, and Schütz himself, whose settings of a handful of passages appeared in his 1611 book of Italian madrigals. Emperors Ferdinand III and Leopold I were great admirers of Italian culture and made Italian (which they themselves spoke perfectly) a prestigious language at their court. German baroque composers or architects were also very much influenced by their Italian counterparts.

During the 18th century, Italy was in the spotlight of the European grand tour, a period in which learned and wealthy foreign, usually British or German, aristocrats visited the country due to its artistic, cultural and archaeological richness. Since then, throughout the centuries, many writers and poets have sung of Italy's beauty; from Goethe to Stendhal to Byron, Italy's natural beauty and her people's creativity inspired their works. Percy Bysshe Shelley famously said that Italy is "the paradise of exiles."

Italiophilia was not uncommon in the United States. Thomas Jefferson was a great admirer of Italy and ancient Rome. Jefferson is largely responsible for the neo-classical buildings in Washington, D.C. that echo Roman and Italian architectural styles.

Spain provided an equally telling example of Italian cultural admiration in the 18th century. The installation of a team of Italian architects and artists, headed by Filippo Juvarra, has been interpreted as part of Queen Elisabeth Farnese's conscious policy to mould the visual culture of the Spanish court along Italian lines. The engagement of Corrado Giaquinto from Molfetta and eventually the Venetian Jacopo Amigoni as the creators of the painted decorative space for the new seat of the Spanish court was a clear indication of this aesthetic orientation, while the later employment of Giovanni Battista Tiepolo and his son Giovanni Domenico confirmed the Italophile tendency.

The Victorian era in Great Britain saw Italophilic tendencies. Britain supported its own version of the imperial Pax Romana, called Pax Britannica. John Ruskin was a Victorian Italophile who respected the concepts of morality held in Italy. Also the great writer Henry James has exhibited Italophilia in several of his novels. However, Ellen Moers writes that "In the history of Victorian Italophilia no name is more prominent than that of Elizabeth Barrett Browning....[She places] Italy as the place for the woman of genius ..."

Italian patriot Giuseppe Garibaldi, along with Giuseppe Mazzini and Camillo Benso, Count of Cavour, led the struggle for Italian unification in the 19th century. For his battles on behalf of freedom in Europe and Latin America, Garibaldi has been dubbed the "Hero of Two Worlds." Many of the greatest intellectuals of his time, such as Victor Hugo, Alexandre Dumas, and George Sand showered him with admiration. He was so appreciated in the United States that Abraham Lincoln offered him a command during the Civil War, (Garibaldi turned it down).

During the Fascist era, several leaders in Europe and Latin America modeled their government and economic system on Italian Fascism. Adolf Hitler was an avid admirer of Benito Mussolini. To justify his Italophilia, Hitler had to convince himself that northern Italians were somehow racially Aryan — "from the cultural point of view," he once remarked, "we are more closely linked with the Italians than with any other people" — and that the veins of Mussolini, Dante and other heroes pulsed with no contaminating blood from the inferior "Mediterranean race." Or "The Italians have a splendid foundation of peasantry. Once when I was travelling to Florence, I thought, as I passed through it, what a paradise this land of southern France is ! But when I reached Italy – then I realised what a paradise on earth can really be!" The Führer also dreamed of touring Tuscany and Umbria: "my dearest wish would be to be able to wander about Italy as an unknown painter".

In 1940 Walt Disney Productions produced Pinocchio based on the Italian children's novel The Adventures of Pinocchio by Carlo Collodi, the most translated non-religious book in the world and one of the best-selling books ever published, as well as a canonical piece of children's literature. The film was the second animated feature film produced by Disney.

After World War II, such brands as Ferrari and Alfa Romeo became well known for racing and sports cars. Since then Italy has experienced a strong economic growth, particularly in the 1950s and 1960s, which lifted the country to the position of being one of the most industrialized nations in the world. Italian product design, fashion, film, and cuisine and the notion of Italy as the embodiment of la dolce vita for German tourism — all left an imprint on contemporary Italophilia.

Tourism

People have visited Italy for centuries, yet the first to visit the peninsula for tourist reasons were aristocrats during the Grand Tour, beginning in the 17th century, and flourishing in the 18th and the 19th century. This was a period in which European aristocrats, many of whom were British and French, visited parts of Europe, with Italy as a key destination. For Italy, this was in order to study ancient architecture, local culture and to admire the natural beauties.

Nowadays the factors of tourist interest in Italy are mainly culture, cuisine, history, fashion, architecture, art, religious sites and routes, wedding tourism, naturalistic beauties, nightlife, underwater sites and spas. Winter and summer tourism are present in many locations in the Alps and the Apennines, while seaside tourism is widespread in coastal locations along the Mediterranean Sea. Rome is the 3rd most visited city in Europe and the 12th in the world, with 9.4 million arrivals in 2017 while Milan is the 27th worldwide with 6.8 million tourists. In addition, Venice and Florence are also among the world's top 100 destinations.

The Roman Empire, Middle Ages, Renaissance and the following centuries of the history of Italy have left many cultural artifacts that attract tourists. In general, the Italian cultural heritage is the largest in the world since it consists of 60 to 75 percent of all the artistic assets that exist on each continent, with over 4,000 museums, 6,000 archaeological sites, 85,000 historic churches and 40,000 historic palaces, all subject to protection by the Italian Ministry of Culture. Italy is the leading cruise tourism destination in the Mediterranean Sea. With 65 million tourists per year (2019) according to ISTAT, Italy is the fifth most visited country in international tourism arrivals, but the second after Spain in terms of nights spent in hotel, with 220,7 million foreign visitor nights spent and a total of 436,7 million nights.

Italian people 

The Italian peninsula has been at the heart of Western cultural development at least since Roman times. Important poets of the Roman republic and empire were Lucretius, Catullus, Virgil, Horace, and Ovid. Also prominent in Latin literature were the orator-rhetorician Cicero; the satirist Juvenal; the prose writers Pliny the Elder, his nephew Pliny the Younger; and the historians Sallust, Livy, and Suetonius. Julius Caesar, renowned as a historian and prose stylist, is even more famous as a military and political leader. Roman jurists founded and developed Roman law which still today represents the basic framework of civil law, the most widespread legal system in the world. Among the most famous jurists: Gaius, Ulpianus, Papinianus, Paulus. 
Italy, as the center of Magna Graecia, was also the land that gave birth to personalities such as Archimedes, Pythagoras, Parmenides, Zeno, Gorgia.
The first of the Roman emperors was Octavian, better known by the honorific Augustus. Noteworthy among later emperors are the tyrants Caligula and Nero, the philosopher-statesman Marcus Aurelius, and Constantine I, who was the first to accept Christianity. 
No history of the Christian Church during the medieval period would be complete without mention of such men of Italian birth as Benedict of Nursia, Pope Gregory I, Francis of Assisi, and the philosopher-theologians Anselm of Canterbury and Thomas Aquinas.

No land has made a greater contribution to the visual arts. In the 13th and 14th centuries there were the sculptors Nicola Pisano and his son Giovanni; the painters Cimabue, Duccio, and Giotto; and, later in the period, the sculptor Andrea Pisano. Among the many great artists of the 15th century — the golden age of Florence and Venice — were the architects Filippo Brunelleschi, Lorenzo Ghiberti, and Leon Battista Alberti; the sculptors Donatello, Luca della Robbia, Desiderio da Settignano, and Andrea del Verrocchio; and the painters Fra Angelico, Stefano di Giovanni, Paolo Uccello, Masaccio, Frà Filippo Lippi, Piero della Francesca, Giovanni Bellini, Andrea Mantegna, Antonello da Messina, Antonio del Pollaiuolo, Luca Signorelli, Pietro Perugino, Sandro Botticelli, Domenico Ghirlandaio, and Vittore Carpaccio.

During the 16th century, the High Renaissance, Rome shared with Florence the leading position in the world of the arts. Major masters included the architects Donato Bramante and Andrea Palladio; the sculptor Benvenuto Cellini; the painter-designer-inventor Leonardo da Vinci; the painter-sculptor-architect Michelangelo Buonarroti; and the painters Titian, Giorgione, Raphael, Andrea del Sarto, and Antonio da Correggio. Among the great painters of the late Renaissance were Tintoretto and Paolo Veronese. Giorgio Vasari was a painter, architect, art historian, and critic.

Among the leading artists of the Baroque period were the sculptors-architects Gian Lorenzo Bernini and Francesco Borromini, or the architects Bartolomeo Rastrelli, Filippo Juvarra and Luigi Vanvitelli; the painters Caravaggio, Guido Reni, Annibale Carracci, Pietro da Cortona, Luca Giordano, Andrea Pozzo, Guercino, Domenichino, Giovanni Battista Tiepolo, Canaletto, Pietro Longhi, and Francesco Guardi. Leading figures in modern painting were Umberto Boccioni, Amedeo Modigliani, Giorgio de Chirico, Lucio Fontana, Alberto Burri, and Giorgio Morandi. A noted contemporary architect were Giuseppe Terragni, Marcello Piacentini, Adalberto Libera, Pier Luigi Nervi, Gio Ponti, Aldo Rossi, Renzo Piano, .

Music, an integral part of Italian life, owes many of its forms as well as its language to Italy. The inventor of Gregorian chant was the Roman Pope Gregory I. The musical staff was either invented or established by Guido of Arezzo. A leading 14th-century composer was the blind Florentine organist Francesco Landini. Leading composers of the High Renaissance and early Baroque periods were Giovanni Pierluigi da Palestrina; the madrigalists Luca Marenzio and Carlo Gesualdo, prince of Venosa; the Venetian organists Andrea Gabrieli and Giovanni Gabrieli; Claudio Monteverdi, one of the founders of opera; organist-composer Girolamo Frescobaldi; and Giacomo Carissimi. One of the father of French opera, and master of French baroque style, was the Italian composer, after naturalized French, Jean-Baptiste Lully. Important figures of the later Baroque era were Arcangelo Corelli, Antonio Vivaldi, Luigi Boccherini, Alessandro Scarlatti, and his son Domenico Scarlatti. Italian-born Luigi Cherubini was the central figure of French music in the Napoleonic era, while Antonio Salieri and Gaspare Spontini played important roles in the musical life of Vienna and Berlin, respectively. 

Composers of the 19th century who made their period the great age of Italian opera were Gioacchino Rossini, Gaetano Donizetti, Vincenzo Bellini, and, above all, Giuseppe Verdi. Niccolò Paganini was the greatest violinist of his time. More recent operatic composers include Ruggero Leoncavallo, Giacomo Puccini, and Pietro Mascagni. Renowned operatic singers include Enrico Caruso, Luisa Tetrazzini, Titta Ruffo, Amelita Galli-Curci, Beniamino Gigli, Ezio Pinza, and Luciano Pavarotti. Ferruccio Busoni, Ottorino Respighi, Luigi Dallapiccola, Alfredo Casella, Luigi Nono, and Luciano Berio are major 20th-century composers. Arturo Toscanini is generally regarded as one of the greatest operatic and orchestral conductors of his time; two noted contemporary conductors are Claudio Abbado and Riccardo Muti. In the field of music for cinema, great Italian composers were Ennio Morricone, Nino Rota, Armando Trovajoli and Giorgio Moroder, the father of disco music. The foremost makers of stringed instruments were Gasparo da Salò of Brescia, Nicolò Amati, Antonio Stradivari, and Giuseppe Guarneri of Cremona. Bartolomeo Cristofori invented the piano.

Italian literature and literary language began with Dante Alighieri, author of The Divine Comedy. Literary achievements — such as the poetry of Petrarch, Torquato Tasso, and Ludovico Ariosto and the prose of Giovanni Boccaccio, Niccolò Machiavelli, and Baldassare Castiglione — exerted a tremendous and lasting influence on the subsequent development of Western culture. Outstanding film directors are Italian-born Frank Capra, Vittorio De Sica, Luchino Visconti, Roberto Rossellini, Michelangelo Antonioni, Federico Fellini, Sergio Leone, Pier Paolo Pasolini, Franco Zeffirelli, Lina Wertmüller, Paolo Sorrentino and Bernardo Bertolucci. Famous film stars include Italian-born Rudolph Valentino, Marcello Mastroianni, Gina Lollobrigida and Sophia Loren.

In philosophy, exploration, and statesmanship, Italy has produced many world-renowned figures: the traveler Marco Polo; the statesman and patron of the arts Cosimo de' Medici; the statesman, clergyman, and artistic patron Rodrigo Borgia, who became Pope Alexander VI; the soldier, statesman, and artistic patron Lorenzo de' Medici, the son of Cosimo; the explorer John Cabot; the explorer Christopher Columbus; the explorer Amerigo Vespucci, after whom the Americas are named; the admiral and statesman Andrea Doria; Caterina de medici, queen of France; Niccolò Machiavelli, author of The Prince and the outstanding political theorist of the Renaissance; the statesman and clergyman Cesare Borgia, the son of Rodrigo; the explorer Sebastian Cabot, the son of John; the historian Francesco Guicciardini; the explorer Giovanni da Verrazzano; the explorer Pietro Savorgnan di Brazzà, who gave his name to the city of Brazzaville, capital of the Republic of Congo; the philosopher Bernardino Telesio. 

The explorer, missionary and sinologist Matteo Ricci; the mathematician, astronomer, and philosopher Giordano Bruno; the scholar Paolo Sarpi, so well versed in many fields of human knowledge to be called the "Oracle of the century"; the philosopher Tommaso Campanella; the Cardinal Mazarin, a statesman, diplomat, and prime minister of France under Louis XIV; the imperial field marshal and statesman Prince Eugene of Savoy; the French military and political leader Napoleone was of Italian family and was born in the same year that the Republic of Genoa (former Italian state) ceded the region of Corsica to France; the political philosopher Giambattista Vico; the noted jurist Cesare Beccaria; Giuseppe Mazzini, the leading spirit of the Risorgimento; Camillo Benso, Count of Cavour, its prime statesman; and Giuseppe Garibaldi, its foremost soldier and man of action. 

Notable intellectual and political leaders of more recent times include the Nobel Peace Prize winner in 1907, Ernesto Teodoro Moneta; the sociologist and economist Vilfredo Pareto; the political theorist Gaetano Mosca; the educator Maria Montessori; the philosopher, critic, and historian Benedetto Croce, with his idealistic antagonist Giovanni Gentile; Benito Mussolini, the founder of Fascism and dictator of Italy from 1922 to 1943; Princess Marie-José was one of the very few diplomatic channels between the German/Italian camp and the other European countries involved in the war, she sympathised with the partisans, and while she was a refugee in Switzerland, smuggled weapons, money and food for them, Carlo Sforza, Alcide De Gasperi and Giulio Andreotti, famous latter-day statesmen; and the Communist leaders Antonio Gramsci, Palmiro Togliatti, and Enrico Berlinguer.
Virginia Oldoini, mistress of Emperor Napoleon III of France, was a significant figure in the early history of photography.

Italian scientists and mathematicians of note include Fibonacci, Gerolamo Cardano, Galileo Galilei, Bonaventura Cavalieri, Evangelista Torricelli, Francesco Maria Grimaldi, Marcello Malpighi, Giuseppe Luigi Lagrangia, Luigi Galvani, Alessandro Volta, Amedeo Avogadro, Stanislao Cannizzaro, Giuseppe Peano, Angelo Secchi, Camillo Golgi, Guglielmo Marconi, Antonio Meucci, Italian-American Enrico Fermi, Ettore Majorana, Emilio Segrè, Tullio Levi-Civita, Gregorio Ricci-Curbastro, Daniel Bovet, Giulio Natta, Rita Levi-Montalcini, Italian-American Riccardo Giacconi and Giorgio Parisi. Elena Cornaro Piscopia was the first female Ph.D. graduate in the world history.

Italian diaspora 

The Italian diaspora is the large-scale emigration of Italians from Italy.

There were two major Italian diasporas in Italian history. The first diaspora began around 1880, two decades after the Unification of Italy, and ended in the 1920s to the early 1940s with the rise of Fascist Italy. Poverty was the main reason for emigration, specifically the lack of land as mezzadria sharecropping flourished in Italy, especially in the South, and property became subdivided over generations. Especially in Southern Italy, conditions were harsh. Until the 1860s to 1950s, most of Italy was a rural society with many small towns and cities and almost no modern industry in which land management practices, especially in the South and the Northeast, did not easily convince farmers to stay on the land and to work the soil.

Another factor was related to the overpopulation of Southern Italy as a result of the improvements in socioeconomic conditions after Unification. That created a demographic boom and forced the new generations to emigrate en masse in the late 19th century and the early 20th century, mostly to the Americas. The new migration of capital created millions of unskilled jobs around the world and was responsible for the simultaneous mass migration of Italians searching for "work and bread".

The second diaspora started after the end of World War II and concluded roughly in the 1970s.

Between 1880 and 1980, about 15,000,000 Italians left the country permanently. By 1980, it was estimated that about 25,000,000 Italians were residing outside Italy. Between 1861 and 1985, 29,036,000 Italians emigrated to other countries; of whom 16,000,000 (55%) arrived before the outbreak of World War I. About 10,275,000 returned to Italy (35%), and 18,761,000 permanently settled overseas (65%).  There is now a National Museum of Italian Emigration, located in Rome, which has on display hundreds of photos from the first two migrations, and provides education to the public about this phenomenon from cultural, political, and economic perspectives.

A third wave, primarily affecting young people, is thought to be occurring, due to the socioeconomic problems caused by the financial crisis of the early 21st century. According to the Public Register of Italian Residents Abroad (AIRE), the number of Italians abroad rose from 3,106,251 in 2006 to 4,636,647 in 2015 and so grew by 49% in just 10 years. There are over 5 million Italian citizens living outside Italy, and  people around the world claim full or partial Italian ancestry.

Internal migration within the Italian geographical borders also occurred for similar reasons; its largest wave consisted in 4 million people moving from Southern Italy to Northern Italy (and mostly to Northern Italian industrial cities), between the 1950s and 1970s.

Languages 

The Romantic English poet, Lord Byron, described the Italian language as «that soft bastard Latin, which melts like kisses from a female mouth, and sounds as if it should be writ on satin». Byron's description is not an isolated expression of poetic fancy but, in fact, a popular view of the Italian language across the world, often called the language of "love," "poetry," and "song."

Italian belongs to the Indo-European family of languages and, like French and Spanish, it is a Romance language, i.e. one of the modern languages that developed from Latin. It is spoken by about 60 million people in Italy, 23,000 in the Republic of San Marino, 400,000 in Switzerland, another 1,3 million in other European countries, and approximately 6 million in the Americas.

Italian evolved from a dialect spoken in Tuscany, which is the birthplace of writers such as Dante, Petrarch and Boccaccio. Thanks to its cultural prestige, this dialect was progressively adopted by the Italian states and then, upon their unification in 1861, by the Kingdom of Italy. It may be considered somewhat intermediate, linguistically and geographically, between the Italo-Dalmatian languages of the Centre-South and the Gallo-Italic languages of the North, becoming the center of a dialect continuum. Its development was also influenced by the other Italian languages and by the Germanic language of post-Roman invaders.

There are only a few communities in Italy in which Italian is not spoken as the first language, but many speakers are native bilinguals of both Italian and Italy's regional languages, which historically predate today's national language. These include native communities of non-Romance and Indo-European languages like Albanian, Croatian and Greek in southern Italy, Slovene and German varieties in Northern Italy, as well as dozens of various Romance languages, such as Arpitan, Catalan, Friulan, Ladin, Lombard, Neapolitan, Occitan, Sardinian, Sicilian, and many others.

Italian is often natively spoken in a regional variety, not to be confused with Italy's regional and minority languages; however, the establishment of a national education system led to a decrease in variation in the languages spoken across the country during the 20th century. Standardisation was further expanded in the 1950s and 1960s due to economic growth and the rise of mass media and television (the state broadcaster RAI helped set a standard Italian).

Libraries and museums 

Italy is one of the world's greatest centers of architecture, art, and books. Among its many of libraries, the most important are in the national library system, which contains two central libraries, in Florence (5.3 million volumes) and Rome (5 million), and four regional libraries, in Naples (1.8 million volumes), Milan (1 million), Turin (973,000) and Venice (917,000). The existence of two national central libraries, while most nations have one, came about through the history of the country, as Rome was once part of the Papal States and Florence was one of the first capitals of the unified Kingdom of Italy. While both libraries are designated as copyright libraries, Florence now serves as the site designated for conservation and cataloging of Italian publications and the site in Rome catalogs foreign publications acquired by the state libraries. All large Italian cities have public libraries.

Italy, a world center of culture, history and art, has more than 3,000 museums. They contain, perhaps, the most important collections of artifacts from ancient civilizations. Taranto's museum, for example, offers material enabling scholars to probe deeply into the history of Magna Graecia. The archaeological collections in the Roman National Museum in Rome and in the National Archaeological Museum in Naples are probably among the world's best. Similarly, the Etruscan collection in the National Archaeological Museum of Umbria in Perugia, the classical sculptures in the Capitoline Museums in Rome, and the Egyptian collection in the Museo Egizio in Turin are, perhaps, the best such collections in the world.

The classical age is not the only age represented in Italy's museums. The Italian Renaissance is well represented in a number of museums: the Uffizi Gallery, Bargello Museum, and Palazzo Pitti are all located in Florence. Many of these museums, are the former palaces of kings or the houses of royal families.

Media

Internet 

In 1986, the first internet connection in Italy was experimented in Pisa, the third in Europe after Norway and the United Kingdom. Already in the late 1970s, Pisan researchers, firstly with Luciano Lenzini, were in contact with U.S. researchers who had written the history of the Internet. Among them were Vint Cerf and Bob Kahn, who were the first to invent TCP and IP, the two protocols at the heart of the internet, and are hence considered the "Fathers of the Internet".

Currently Internet access is available to businesses and home users in various forms, including dial-up, cable, DSL, and wireless. The .it is the Internet country code top-level domain (ccTLD) for Italy. The .eu domain is also used, as it is shared with other European Union member states.

According to data released by the fibre-to-the-home (FTTH) Council Europe, Italy represents one of the largest FTTH markets in Europe, with more than 2,5 million homes passed by fibre at end-December 2010; at the same date the country reported around 348,000 fibre subscribers. The "Fibre for Italy" project (with the participation of providers Fastweb, Vodafone and Wind in a co-investment partnership) aims to reach 20 million people in Italy's 15 largest cities by 2015, and Telecom Italia plans to connect 138 cities by 2018. The government has also started the Italia Digitale project, which aims to provide at least 50% of Italians with high-speed internet access by 2020. The government aims to extend the fibre-optic network to rural areas.

Figures published by the National Institute of Statistics showed at end-2011 that 58,8% of Italian families had a personal computer (up slightly from 57,6% in 2010); 54,5% had access to the internet (up from 52,4%); and 45,8% had broadband access (up from 43,4%). Over one-fourth (26,3%, down slightly from 26,4% in 2010) of Italian internet users aged 14 and older made an online purchase during 2011.

Newspapers and periodicals 

, there were about 90 daily newspapers in the country, but not all of them had national circulation. According to Audipress statistics, the major daily newspapers (with their political orientations and estimated circulations) are: la Repubblica, left-wing, 3,276,000 in 2011; Corriere della Sera, independent, 3,274,000 in 2011; La Stampa, liberal, 2,132,000 in 2011; Il Messaggero, left of center, 1,567,000 in 2011; il Resto del Carlino, right of center, 1,296,000 in 2011; Il Sole 24 Ore, a financial news paper, 1,015,000 in 2011; il Giornale, independent, 728,000 in 2011; and l'Unità, Communist, 291,000 in 2011. TV Sorrisi e Canzoni is the most popular news weekly with a circulation of 677,658 in July 2012. The periodical press is becoming increasingly important. Among the most important periodicals are the pictorial weeklies — Oggi, L'Europeo, L'espresso, and Gente. Famiglia Cristiana is a Catholic weekly periodical with a wide readership.

The majority of papers are published in northern and central Italy, and circulation is highest in these areas. Rome and Milan are the most important publication centers. A considerable number of dailies are owned by the political parties, the Roman Catholic Church, and various economic groups. In general, the journalistic level of the Italian papers is high, and two dailies, Milan's Corriere della Sera and Turin's La Stampa, enjoy international respect.

The law provides for freedom of speech and the press, and the government is said to respect these rights in practice.

Radio 

Of all the claimants to the title of the "Father of Radio", the one most associated with it is the Italian inventor Guglielmo Marconi. He was the first person to send radio communication signals in 1895. By 1899 he flashed the first wireless signal across the English Channel and two years later received the letter "S", telegraphed from England to Newfoundland. This was the first successful transatlantic radiotelegraph message in 1902.

Today, radio waves that are broadcast from thousands of stations, along with waves from other sources, fill the air around us continuously. Italy has three state-controlled radio networks that broadcast day and evening hours on both AM and FM. Program content varies from popular music to lectures, panel discussions, classical music, and opera, as well as frequent newscasts and feature reports. In addition, many private radio stations mix popular and classical music. A short-wave radio, though unnecessary, aids in reception of VOA, BBC, Vatican Radio in English and the Armed Forces Network in Germany and in other European stations.

Television 

The first form of televised media in Italy was introduced in 1939, when the first experimental broadcasting began. However, this lasted for a very short time: when fascist Italy entered World War II in 1940, all the transmission were interrupted, and were resumed in earnest only nine years after the end of the conflict, in 1954.

There are two main national television organisations responsible for most viewing: state-owned RAI, funded by a yearly mandatory licence fee and Mediaset, commercial network founded by Silvio Berlusconi. Currently La7 is considered as the third major network in Italy, it is owned by Telecom Italia Media, the media branch of the telephone company Telecom Italia, which also owns 51% of MTV Italia. While many other networks are also present, both nationally and locally, RAI and Mediaset together, with their six traditional ex analogue stations plus a number of new free to air digital channels, reach almost 70% of the TV ratings.

The television networks offer varied programs, including news, soap operas, reality TV shows, game shows, sitcoms, cartoons, and films-all in Italian. All programs are in color, except for the old black-and-white movies. Most Italians still depend on VHF/UHF reception, but both cable systems and direct satellite reception is increasingly common. Conventional satellite dishes can pick up European broadcasts, including some in English.

National symbols 

National symbols of Italy are the symbols that uniquely identify Italy reflecting its history and culture. They are used to represent the Nation through emblems, metaphors, personifications, allegories, which are shared by the entire Italian people.

The three main official symbols, whose typology is present in the symbology of all nations, are:
 the flag of Italy, that is, the national flag in green, white and red, as required by article 12 of the Constitution of the Italian Republic;
 the emblem of Italy, that is the iconic symbol identifying the Italian Republic;
 The Il Canto degli Italiani by Goffredo Mameli and Michele Novaro, the Italian national anthem, which is performed in all public events.

Of these only the flag is explicitly mentioned in the Italian Constitution; this normative insertion puts the flag under the protection of the law, making it possible criminal penalties for contempt of the same.

Other official symbols, as reported by the Presidency of the Italian Republic, are:
 the Presidential Standard of Italy, that is the distinctive standard representing the Presidency of the Italian Republic;
 the Altare della Patria, or the national monument dedicated to King Vittorio Emanuele II of Savoy, the first Sovereign of a united Italy and founder of the Fatherland, which houses the shrine of the Italian tomb of the Unknown Soldier.
 the Festa della Repubblica, that is the national celebratory day established to commemorate the birth of the Italian Republic, which is celebrated every year on 2 June, date of the institutional referendum of 1946 with which the monarchy was abolished;

The teaching in the schools of the Il Canto degli Italiani, the reflection on the Risorgimento events, and on the adoption of the Flag of Italy are prescribed by law n. 222 of 23 November 2012.

There are also other symbols or emblems of Italy which, although not defined by law, are part of the Italian identity:

 the Italia turrita, that is the national personification of Italy in the appearance of a young woman with her head surrounded by a wall crown completed by towers (hence the term "turrita");
 the cockade of Italy, or the national ornament of Italy, obtained by folding a green, white and red ribbon into plissé using the technique called plissage ("pleating");
 the Italian wolf, which inhabits Apennine Mountains and the Western Alps, features prominently in Latin and Italian cultures, such as in the legend of the founding of Rome. It is unofficially considered the national animal of Italy.
 the national colours of Italy are green, white, and red, collectively known in Italian as il tricolore (the tricolour). In sport in Italy, savoy azure has been used or adopted as the colour for many national teams, the first being the men's football team in 1910. The national auto racing colour of Italy is instead rosso corsa ("racing red"), while in other disciplines such as cycling and winter sports, which often use white.
 the strawberry tree, or the small tree chosen as a national tree because of its green leaves, its white flowers and its red berries, colors that recall the Italian flag;
 the Stella d'Italia, the most ancient identity symbol of Italian land, since it dates back to ancient Greece.
 the Frecce Tricolori, or the national aerobatic team of the Italian Air Force.

Nobel Prizes

Politics 

Italy has been a unitary parliamentary republic since 2 June 1946, when the monarchy was abolished by a constitutional referendum. The President of Italy (Presidente della Repubblica), currently Sergio Mattarella since 2015, is Italy's head of state. The President is elected for a single seven years mandate by the Parliament of Italy and some regional voters in joint session. Italy has a written democratic constitution, resulting from the work of a Constituent Assembly formed by the representatives of all the anti-fascist forces that contributed to the defeat of Nazi and Fascist forces during the Italian Civil War.

Italy has a parliamentary government based on a mixed proportional and majoritarian voting system. The parliament is perfectly bicameral: the two houses, the Chamber of Deputies that meets in Palazzo Montecitorio, and the Senate of the Republic that meets in Palazzo Madama, have the same powers. The Prime Minister, officially President of the Council of Ministers (Presidente del Consiglio dei Ministri), is Italy's head of government. The Prime Minister and the cabinet are appointed by the President of the Republic of Italy and must pass a vote of confidence in Parliament to come into office. To remain the Prime Minister has to pass also eventual further votes of confidence or no confidence in Parliament.

The prime minister is the President of the Council of Ministers – which holds effective executive power – and he must receive a vote of approval from it to execute most political activities. The office is similar to those in most other parliamentary systems, but the leader of the Italian government is not authorised to request the dissolution of the Parliament of Italy.

Another difference with similar offices is that the overall political responsibility for intelligence is vested in the President of the Council of Ministers. By virtue of that, the Prime Minister has exclusive power to: co-ordinate intelligence policies, determining the financial resources and strengthening national cyber security; apply and protect State secrets; authorise agents to carry out operations, in Italy or abroad, in violation of the law.

A peculiarity of the Italian Parliament is the representation given to Italian citizens permanently living abroad: 12 Deputies and 6 Senators elected in four distinct overseas constituencies. In addition, the Italian Senate is characterised also by a small number of senators for life, appointed by the President "for outstanding patriotic merits in the social, scientific, artistic or literary field". Former Presidents of the Republic are ex officio life senators.

Italy was a founding member of the European Community — now the European Union. Italy was admitted to the United Nations in 1955 and is a member and strong supporter of the North Atlantic Treaty Organization, the Organisation for Economic Co-operation and Development, the General Agreement on Tariffs and Trade/World Trade Organization, the Organization for Security and Co-operation in Europe, and the Council of Europe. Its recent turns in the rotating Presidency of international organisations include the Conference for Security and Co-operation in Europe, the forerunner of the OSCE, in 1994; G8; and the EU in 2001 and from July to December 2003.

The law of Italy has a plurality of sources of production. These are arranged in a hierarchical scale, under which the rule of a lower source cannot conflict with the rule of an upper source (hierarchy of sources). The Constitution of 1948 is the main source.
The judiciary of Italy is based on Roman law modified by the Napoleonic code and later statutes. The Supreme Court of Cassation is the highest court in Italy for both criminal and civil appeal cases. The Constitutional Court of Italy (Corte Costituzionale) rules on the conformity of laws with the constitution and is a post–World War II innovation.

Law enforcement

The Italian law enforcement system is complex, with multiple police forces. The national policing agencies are the Polizia di Stato (State Police), the Arma dei Carabinieri, the Guardia di Finanza (Financial Guard), and the Polizia Penitenziaria (Prison Police), as well as the Guardia Costiera (coast guard police).

The Polizia di Stato are a civil police supervised by the Interior Ministry, while the Carabinieri is a gendarmerie supervised by the Defense Ministry; both share duties in law enforcement and the maintenance of public order. Within the Carabinieri is a unit devoted to combating environmental crime. The Guardia di Finanza is responsible for combating financial crime and white-collar crime, as well as customs. The Polizia Penitenziaria are responsible for guarding the prison system. The Corpo Forestale dello Stato (State Forestry Corps) formerly existed as a separate national park ranger agency, but was merged into the Carabinieri in 2016. Although policing in Italy is primarily provided on a national basis, there also exists Polizia Provinciale (provincial police) and Polizia Municipale (municipal police).

Public holidays 

Public holidays celebrated in Italy include religious, national and regional observances. Italy's National Day, the Festa della Repubblica (Republic Day), is celebrated on 2 June each year, with the main celebration taking place in Rome, and commemorates the birth of the Italian Republic in 1946. The ceremony of the event organized in Rome includes the deposition of a laurel wreath as a tribute to the Italian Unknown Soldier at the Altare della Patria by the President of the Italian Republic and a military parade along Via dei Fori Imperiali in Rome.

Liberation Day is a national holiday in Italy that commemorates the victory of the Italian resistance movement against Nazi Germany and the Italian Social Republic, puppet state of the Nazis and rump state of the fascists, in the Italian Civil War, a civil war in Italy fought during World War II. which takes place on 25 April. The date was chosen by convention, as it was the day of the year 1945 when the National Liberation Committee of Upper Italy (CLNAI) officially proclaimed the insurgency in a radio announcement, propounding the seizure of power by the CLNAI and proclaiming the death sentence for all fascist leaders (including Benito Mussolini, who was shot three days later).

National Unity and Armed Forces Day is an Italian national day since 1919 which commemorates the victory in World War I, a war event considered the completion of the process of unification of Italy. It is celebrated every 4 November, which is the anniversary of the armistice of Villa Giusti becoming effective in 1918 declaring Austria-Hungary's surrender. Italy entered the World War I in 1915 with the aim of completing national unity: for this reason, the Italian intervention in the World War I is also considered the Fourth Italian War of Independence, in a historiographical perspective that identifies in the latter the conclusion of the unification of Italy, whose military actions began during the revolutions of 1848 with the First Italian War of Independence. The Treaty of Saint-Germain-en-Laye (1919) and the Treaty of Rapallo (1920) allowed the annexation of Trentino Alto-Adige, Julian March, Istria, Kvarner as well as the Dalmatian city of Zara; the subsequent Treaty of Rome (1924) led to the annexation of the city of Fiume to Italy.

The Anniversary of the Unification of Italy is a national day that falls annually on 17 March and celebrates the birth of Italy as modern nation state, which took place following the proclamation of the Kingdom of Italy on 17 March 1861; however, the complete unification of Italy took place only in the following years. In 1866 the Veneto and the province of Mantua were annexed after the Third Italian War of Independence, then in 1870 Lazio after the capture of Rome, and finally in 1918 Trentino-Alto Adige and Julian March after the World War I. The anniversary of the birth of the Italian state was solemnly celebrated in 1911 (50 years), in 1961 (100 years), and in 2011 (150 years).

The Tricolour Day, officially National Flag Day, is the flag day of Italy. Celebrated on 7 January, it was established by Law 671 on 31 December 1996. It is intended as a celebration, though not a public holiday. The official celebration of the day is held in Reggio Emilia, the city where the Italian tricolour was first adopted by an Italian sovereign state, the Cispadane Republic, on 7 January 1797. In Rome, at the Quirinal Palace, the ceremonial foresees instead the change of the Guard of honour in solemn form with the deployment and the parade of the Corazzieri Regiment in gala uniform and the Fanfare of the Carabinieri Cavalry Regiment. This solemn rite is carried out only on three other occasions, during the celebrations of the Anniversary of the Unification of Italy (17 March), of the Festa della Repubblica (2 June) and of the National Unity and Armed Forces Day (4 November).

The National Memorial Day of the Exiles and Foibe is an Italian celebration for the memory of the victims of the Foibe and the Istrian–Dalmatian exodus, which led to the emigration of hundreds of thousands (between 230,000 to 350,000) of local ethnic Italians (Istrian Italians and Dalmatian Italians) from Yugoslavia after the end of the World War II. The Italian Law 92 of 30 March 2004 instituted a Day of Remembrance on 10 February to commemorate the victims of Foibe and the forced exodus of nearly the entire population of Italian origin living in Dalmatia and Julian March brought about by Yugoslavia. The law also instituted a special medal to be conferred on relatives of victims. The date of 10 February is the day on which the peace treaties of Paris were signed. These treaties transferred the previously Italian areas of Istria, Kvarner, the Dalmatian city of Zadar and most of Julian March to Yugoslavia.

Religion 

In 2017, the proportion of Italians who identified themselves as Roman Catholic Christians was 74.4%. Since 1985, Catholicism is no longer officially the state religion. Italy has the world's fifth-largest Catholic population, and is the largest Catholic nation in Europe.

The Holy See, the episcopal jurisdiction of Rome, contains the central government of the Catholic Church. It is recognised by other subjects of international law as a sovereign entity, headed by the Pope, who is also the Bishop of Rome, with which diplomatic relations can be maintained. Often incorrectly referred to as "the Vatican", the Holy See is not the same entity as the Vatican City State because the Holy See is the jurisdiction and administrative entity of the Pope. The Vatican City came into existence only in 1929.

In 2011, minority Christian faiths in Italy included an estimated 1.5 million Orthodox Christians, or 2.5% of the population; 500,000 Pentecostals and Evangelicals (of whom 400,000 are members of the Assemblies of God), 251,192 Jehovah's Witnesses, 30,000 Waldensians, 25,000 Seventh-day Adventists, 26,925 Latter-day Saints, 15,000 Baptists (plus some 5,000 Free Baptists), 7,000 Lutherans, 4,000 Methodists (affiliated with the Waldensian Church).

One of the longest-established minority religious faiths in Italy is Judaism, Jews having been present in Ancient Rome since before the birth of Christ. Italy has for centuries welcomed Jews expelled from other countries, notably Spain. However, about 20% of Italian Jews were killed during the Holocaust. This, together with the emigration which preceded and followed World War II, has left only around 28,400 Jews in Italy.

Soaring immigration in the last two decades has been accompanied by an increase in non-Christian faiths. Following immigration from the Indian subcontinent, in Italy there are 120,000 Hindus, 70,000 Sikhs and 22 gurdwaras across the country.

The Italian state, as a measure to protect religious freedom, devolves shares of income tax to recognised religious communities, under a regime known as Eight per thousand. Donations are allowed to Christian, Jewish, Buddhist and Hindu communities; however, Islam remains excluded, since no Muslim communities have yet signed a concordat with the Italian state. Taxpayers who do not wish to fund a religion contribute their share to the state welfare system.

It is noteworthy to pinpoint that owing to the Italian Renaissance, church art in Italy is extraordinary, including works by Leonardo da Vinci, Michelangelo, Fra Carnevale, Gian Lorenzo Bernini, Sandro Botticelli, Tintoretto, Titian, Raphael, and Giotto, etc. Italian church architecture is equally spectacular and historically important to Western culture, notably St. Peter's Basilica in Rome, Cathedral of St. Mark's in Venice, and Brunelleschi's Florence Cathedral, which includes the "Gates of Paradise" doors at the Baptistery by Lorenzo Ghiberti.

Sports

The most popular sport in Italy is football. Italy's national football team is one of the world's most successful teams with four FIFA World Cup victories (1934, 1938, 1982 and 2006). Italian clubs have won 48 major European trophies, making Italy the second most successful country in European football. Italy's top-flight club football league is named Serie A and is followed by millions of fans around the world.

Other popular team sports in Italy include basketball, volleyball and rugby. Italy's male and female national volleyball teams are often featured among the world's best. The Italian national basketball team's best results were gold at Eurobasket 1983 and EuroBasket 1999, as well as silver at the Olympics in 2004. Lega Basket Serie A is widely considered one of the most competitive in Europe. Italy's rugby national team competes in the Six Nations Championship, and is a regular at the Rugby World Cup. The men's volleyball team won three consecutive World Championships (in 1990, 1994, and 1998) and earned the Olympic silver medal in 1996, 2004, and 2016.

Italy has a long and successful tradition in individual sports as well. Bicycle racing is a familiar sport in the country. Italians have won the UCI World Championships more than any other country, except Belgium. The Giro d'Italia is a cycling race held every May, and constitutes one of the three Grand Tours.
Alpine skiing is also a widespread sport in Italy, and the country is a popular international skiing destination, known for its ski resorts. Italian skiers achieved good results in Winter Olympic Games, Alpine Ski World Cup, and tennis has a significant following in Italy, ranking as the fourth most practised sport in the country. The Rome Masters, founded in 1930, is one of the most prestigious tennis tournaments in the world. Italian professional tennis players won the Davis Cup in 1976 and the Fed Cup in 2006, 2009, 2010 and 2013.

Motorsports are also extremely popular in Italy. Italy has won, by far, the most MotoGP World Championships. Italian Scuderia Ferrari is the oldest surviving team in Grand Prix racing, having competed since 1948, and statistically the most successful Formula One team in history with a record of 232 wins. The Italian Grand Prix of Formula 1 is the fifth oldest surviving Grand Prix, having been held since 1921. It is also one of the two Grand Prix present in every championship since the first one in 1950. Every Formula 1 Grand Prix (except for the 1980) has been held at Autodromo Nazionale Monza. Formula 1 was also held at Imola (1980–2006, 2020) and Mugello (2020). Other successful Italian car manufacturers in motorsports are Alfa Romeo, Lancia, Maserati and Fiat.

Historically, Italy has been successful in the Olympic Games, taking part from the first Olympiad and in 47 Games out of 48, not having officially participated in the 1904 Summer Olympics. Italian sportsmen have won 522 medals at the Summer Olympic Games, and another 106 at the Winter Olympic Games, for a combined total of 628 medals with 235 golds, which makes them the fifth most successful nation in Olympic history for total medals. The country hosted two Winter Olympics and will host a third (in 1956, 2006, and 2026), and one Summer games (in 1960).

Traditions 

Christmas in Italy begins on 8 December, with the feast of the Immaculate Conception, the day on which traditionally the Christmas tree is mounted and ends on 6 January, of the following year with the Epiphany (in Italian: Epifania). The tradition of the nativity scene comes from Italy. What is considered the first nativity scene in history (a living nativity scene) was set up by St. Francis Of Assisi in Greccio in 1223. However, nativity scenes were already found in Naples in 1025. In Italy, regional crib traditions then spread, such as that of the Neapolitan crib.

In Italy, New Year's Eve ( or Notte di San Silvestro) is celebrated by the observation of traditional rituals, such as wearing red underwear. An ancient tradition in southern regions which is rarely followed today was disposing of old or unused items by dropping them from the window. Dinner is traditionally eaten with relatives and friends. It often includes zampone or cotechino (a meal made with pig's trotters or entrails), and lentils. At 20:30, the President of Italy reads a television message of greetings to Italians. At midnight, fireworks are displayed all across the country. Rarely followed today is the tradition that consist in eating lentil stew when the bell tolls midnight, one spoonful per bell. This is supposed to bring good fortune; the round lentils represent coins.

The Saint Lucy's Day, which take place on 13 December, is popular among children in some Italian regions, where she plays a role similar to Santa Claus. In addition, the Epiphany in Italy is associated with the folkloristic figure of the Befana, a broomstick-riding old woman who, in the night between 5 and 6 January, bringing good children gifts and sweets, and bad ones charcoal or bags of ashes. The Assumption of Mary coincides with Ferragosto on 15 August, the summer vacation period which may be a long weekend or most of the month. 

In Italy, a sagra (plural: sagre) is a popular festival of a local nature and annual frequency, which traditionally arises from a religious festival, celebrated on the occasion of a consecration or to commemorate a saint (usually the patron saint), but also used to celebrate the harvest or promote a food and wine product local. During a festival the local fair, the market and various celebrations usually take place. A sagra is often dedicated to some specific local food, and the name of the sagra includes that food; for example: Festival delle Sagre astigiane, a Sagra dell'uva (grapes) at Marino, a Sagra della Rana (frog) at Casteldilago near Arrone, a Sagra della Cipolla (onion) at Cannara, a Sagra della Melanzana ripiena (stuffed eggplant) at Savona, a Sagra della Polenta at Perticara di Novafeltria, a Sagra del Lattarino at Bracciano, a Sagra del Frico at Carpacco-Dignano and so on. Among the most common sagre are those celebrating olive oil, wine, pasta and pastry of various kinds, chestnuts, and cheese.

The Italian national patronal day, on 4 October, celebrates Saints Francis and Catherine. Each city or town also celebrates a public holiday on the occasion of the festival of the local patron saint, for example: Rome on 29 June (Saints Peter and Paul), Milan on 7 December (Saint Ambrose), Naples on 19 September (Saint Januarius), Venice on 25 April (Saint Mark the Evangelist) and Florence on 24 June (Saint John the Baptist). Notable traditional patronal festivals in Italy are the Feast of Saints Francis and Catherine, the Festival of Saint Agatha, the Feast of Saints Peter and Paul, the Feast of San Gennaro and the Feast of Our Lady of the Hens.

There are many traditional festivals in Italy. Some of them include the Palio di Siena horse race, Holy Week rites, Saracen Joust of Arezzo, Saint Ubaldo Day in Gubbio, Festival of Saint Agatha of Catania, Scoppio del carro in Florence, Fish Festival of Camogli, Infiorate di Spello, Festival of Saint Rosalia in Palermo, Notte della Taranta of Salento, Chilli Festival in Diamante, Grape Festival in Marino, Christmas markets of Trentino-Alto Adige, Nativity play in Sassi di Matera, Almond Blossom Festival in Agrigento, Tulip Festival in Castiglione del Lago, May Day in Assisi, Festival of the Knot of Love in Valeggio sul Mincio, Medieval Festivals in Brisighella, Prosciutto di San Daniele Festival in San Daniele del Friuli, Festa del Redentore in Venice, Macchina di Santa Rosa in Viterbo, Rice Fair in Isola della Scala, Barcolana regatta in Trieste, Regatta of the Historical Marine Republics and Nougat Festival in Cremona. In 2013, UNESCO has included among the intangible cultural heritage some Italian festivals and pasos (in Italian "macchine a spalla"), such as the Varia di Palmi, the Macchina di Santa Rosa in Viterbo, the Festa dei Gigli in Nola, and faradda di li candareri in Sassari. Another traditional festival is the Calcio Fiorentino (also referred to as calcio storico, "historic football"), an early form of football (soccer and rugby) that originated during the Middle Ages and is still played annually today in the Piazza Santa Croce in  Florence. Other important traditional festivals are the Palio di Asti, the Palio di Legnano, the Palio di Ferrara, the Giostra del Saracino and the Giostra della Quintana. 

Where the Ambrosian rite is observed, that is, in most of the churches of the archdiocese of Milan and in some of the neighboring dioceses, the Carnival ends on the first Sunday of Lent; the last day of carnival is Saturday, 4 days later than the Tuesday when it ends where the Roman rite is observed. Above all, the Carnival of Venice and the Carnival of Viareggio, but also the Carnival of Ivrea have a reputation that goes beyond national borders and are popular with tourists from both Italy and abroad. These carnivals include sophisticate masquerades and parades. A completely different form or Carnival takes place in Sardinia, based on rituals to awaken the earth after Winter, possibly descending from pre-Christian traditions.

UNESCO World Heritage Sites 

The United Nations Educational, Scientific and Cultural Organization (UNESCO) World Heritage Sites are places of importance to cultural or natural heritage as described in the UNESCO World Heritage Convention, established in 1972. Cultural heritage consists of monuments (such as architectural works, monumental sculptures, or inscriptions), groups of buildings, and sites (including archaeological sites). Natural features (consisting of physical and biological formations), geological and physiographical formations (including habitats of threatened species of animals and plants), and natural sites which are important from the point of view of science, conservation or natural beauty, are defined as natural heritage. Italy ratified the convention on June 23, 1978.

The first site in Italy, the Rock Drawings in Valcamonica, was listed at the 3rd Session of the World Heritage Committee, held in Cairo and Luxor, Egypt, in 1979. Italy is the country with the highest concentration in the world of the UNESCO World Heritage Sites. , Italy has a total of 58 inscribed sites, making it the country with the most World Heritage Sites just above China (56). Out of Italy's 58 heritage sites, 53 are cultural and 5 are natural.  

Among the most famous Italian UNESCO World Heritage Sites there are Sassi di Matera; Porto Venere, Palmaria, Tino, Tinetto and Cinque Terre; Val d'Orcia; Early Christian Monuments of Ravenna; Valle dei Templi; Alberobello; Etruscan Necropolises of Cerveteri and Tarquinia; Pompeii, Torre Annunziata and Herculaneum; Palmanova; Barumini nuraghes; Dolomites; Santa Maria delle Grazie and The Last Supper; Castel del Monte; Royal Palace of Caserta, Aqueduct of Vanvitelli and San Leucio Complex; Syracuse and Necropolis of Pantalica; Villa d'Este; Langhe-Roero and Montferrat; Aeolian Islands; Val di Noto; Amalfi Coast; Rhaetian Railway in the Albula/Bernina Landscapes; Aquileia; Duomo and the Leaning Tower of Pisa; Arab-Norman Palermo and the Cathedral Churches of Cefalù and Monreale; Residences of the Royal House of Savoy; Parco Nazionale del Cilento, Vallo di Diano e Alburni, Paestum, Velia and Certosa di Padula; Scrovegni Chapel.

Seven sites are transnational. The Historic Centre of Rome is shared with the Vatican; the Monte San Giorgio and Rhaetian Railway  with Switzerland; the Venetian Works of Defence with Croatia and Montenegro; the Prehistoric pile dwellings around the Alps with 5 other countries; The Great Spa Towns of Europe with 6 other countries; and the Ancient and Primeval Beech Forests of the Carpathians and Other Regions of Europe are shared with 17 other countries.

Women 

Women in Italy refers to females who are from (or reside in) Italy. The legal and social status of Italian women has undergone rapid transformations and changes during the past decades. This includes family laws, the enactment of anti-discrimination measures, and reforms to the penal code (in particular with regard to crimes of violence against women).

During the Middle ages, Italian women were considered to have very few social powers and resources, although some women inherited ruling positions from their fathers. Educated women could find opportunities of leadership only in religious convents. The Renaissance (15th–16th centuries) challenged conventional customs from the Medieval period. Women were still confined to the roles of "monaca, moglie, serva, cortigiana" ("nun, wife, servant, courtesan"). By the late 16th and early 17th centuries, Italian women intellectuals were embraced by contemporary culture as learned daughters, wives, mothers, and equal partners in their household. In the 18th-century, the Enlightenment offered for the first time to Italian women  the possibility to engage in the fields of science and mathematics.

In the 19th century, the Napoleonic Age and the Risorgimento offered for the first time to Italian women the opportunity to be politically engaged. In the early 19th century, some of the most influential salons where Italian patriots, revolutionaries, and intellectuals were meeting were run by women. By the 1880s, women were making inroads into higher education. In the 20th century, women's rights suffered a setback under the Fascist government of Benito Mussolini, with fascist ideology dictating procreation as a woman's duty. More than 50,000 women, mostly in their twenties, took part in the Italian resistance movement during the Italian Civil War, when Italy was under German occupation (1939-1945). Their mass participation increased the involvement of women in Italian political life.

After World War II, women were given the right to vote in 1946 Italian institutional referendum. The new Italian Constitution of 1948 affirmed that women had equal rights. It was not however until the 1970s that women in Italy scored some major achievements with the introduction of laws regulating divorce (1970), abortion (1978), and the approval in 1975 of the new family code. Today, women have the same legal rights as men in Italy, and have mainly the same job, business, and education opportunities.

Famous women of the period include politicians Nilde Iotti, Tina Anselmi, and Emma Bonino; actresses Anna Magnani, Sofia Loren, and Gina Lollobrigida; soprano Renata Tebaldi; ballet dancer Carla Fracci; costume designer Milena Canonero; sportswomen Sara Simeoni, Deborah Compagnoni, Valentina Vezzali, Francesca Schiavone, Flavia Pennetta and Federica Pellegrini; writers Natalia Ginzburg, Elsa Morante, Dacia Maraini, Maria Bellonci, Cristina Campo, Anna Maria Ortese, Antonia Pozzi, Alda Merini and Oriana Fallaci; architect Gae Aulenti; scientist and 1986 Nobel Prize winner Rita Levi-Montalcini; astrophysicist Margherita Hack; astronaut Samantha Cristoforetti; pharmacologist Elena Cattaneo; and CERN Director-General Fabiola Gianotti.

See also

 Culture of Europe
 List of cultural icons of Italy

Footnotes

References

External links
 Marrazzo, N. Massimo, "my name is Italia – What you don't know about Italy - This presentation highlights certain economic data about Italy that are never mentioned, or not mentioned enough, in order to counter certain widespread prejudices that are not based on facts" (PDF), 2018

Italian culture